

305001–305100 

|-bgcolor=#E9E9E9
| 305001 ||  || — || October 9, 2007 || Kitt Peak || Spacewatch || — || align=right | 1.1 km || 
|-id=002 bgcolor=#E9E9E9
| 305002 ||  || — || October 9, 2007 || Kitt Peak || Spacewatch || — || align=right | 1.3 km || 
|-id=003 bgcolor=#fefefe
| 305003 ||  || — || October 12, 2007 || Catalina || CSS || — || align=right | 1.2 km || 
|-id=004 bgcolor=#E9E9E9
| 305004 ||  || — || October 12, 2007 || Mount Lemmon || Mount Lemmon Survey || — || align=right | 3.0 km || 
|-id=005 bgcolor=#E9E9E9
| 305005 ||  || — || October 12, 2007 || Kitt Peak || Spacewatch || — || align=right | 1.8 km || 
|-id=006 bgcolor=#E9E9E9
| 305006 ||  || — || October 10, 2007 || Lulin Observatory || LUSS || — || align=right | 1.8 km || 
|-id=007 bgcolor=#E9E9E9
| 305007 ||  || — || October 11, 2007 || Kitt Peak || Spacewatch || — || align=right | 1.5 km || 
|-id=008 bgcolor=#E9E9E9
| 305008 ||  || — || October 11, 2007 || Kitt Peak || Spacewatch || — || align=right | 2.7 km || 
|-id=009 bgcolor=#E9E9E9
| 305009 ||  || — || October 11, 2007 || Kitt Peak || Spacewatch || — || align=right | 1.1 km || 
|-id=010 bgcolor=#E9E9E9
| 305010 ||  || — || October 11, 2007 || Kitt Peak || Spacewatch || — || align=right | 1.2 km || 
|-id=011 bgcolor=#E9E9E9
| 305011 ||  || — || October 11, 2007 || Kitt Peak || Spacewatch || — || align=right | 1.4 km || 
|-id=012 bgcolor=#E9E9E9
| 305012 ||  || — || October 15, 2007 || Kitt Peak || Spacewatch || — || align=right data-sort-value="0.95" | 950 m || 
|-id=013 bgcolor=#E9E9E9
| 305013 ||  || — || October 10, 2007 || Mount Lemmon || Mount Lemmon Survey || — || align=right | 1.2 km || 
|-id=014 bgcolor=#E9E9E9
| 305014 ||  || — || October 11, 2007 || Catalina || CSS || — || align=right | 2.3 km || 
|-id=015 bgcolor=#fefefe
| 305015 ||  || — || October 13, 2007 || Catalina || CSS || V || align=right data-sort-value="0.94" | 940 m || 
|-id=016 bgcolor=#E9E9E9
| 305016 ||  || — || October 14, 2007 || Mount Lemmon || Mount Lemmon Survey || WIT || align=right data-sort-value="0.97" | 970 m || 
|-id=017 bgcolor=#E9E9E9
| 305017 ||  || — || October 14, 2007 || Mount Lemmon || Mount Lemmon Survey || — || align=right | 1.5 km || 
|-id=018 bgcolor=#E9E9E9
| 305018 ||  || — || October 14, 2007 || Mount Lemmon || Mount Lemmon Survey || — || align=right | 3.2 km || 
|-id=019 bgcolor=#E9E9E9
| 305019 ||  || — || October 14, 2007 || Mount Lemmon || Mount Lemmon Survey || — || align=right data-sort-value="0.86" | 860 m || 
|-id=020 bgcolor=#E9E9E9
| 305020 ||  || — || October 14, 2007 || Mount Lemmon || Mount Lemmon Survey || — || align=right | 1.5 km || 
|-id=021 bgcolor=#E9E9E9
| 305021 ||  || — || October 14, 2007 || Kitt Peak || Spacewatch || — || align=right | 2.0 km || 
|-id=022 bgcolor=#fefefe
| 305022 ||  || — || October 14, 2007 || Kitt Peak || Spacewatch || V || align=right data-sort-value="0.81" | 810 m || 
|-id=023 bgcolor=#E9E9E9
| 305023 ||  || — || October 14, 2007 || Mount Lemmon || Mount Lemmon Survey || ADE || align=right | 2.2 km || 
|-id=024 bgcolor=#fefefe
| 305024 ||  || — || October 13, 2007 || Catalina || CSS || NYS || align=right | 1.1 km || 
|-id=025 bgcolor=#fefefe
| 305025 ||  || — || October 15, 2007 || Catalina || CSS || — || align=right | 1.4 km || 
|-id=026 bgcolor=#E9E9E9
| 305026 ||  || — || October 15, 2007 || Kitt Peak || Spacewatch || — || align=right | 1.1 km || 
|-id=027 bgcolor=#fefefe
| 305027 ||  || — || October 15, 2007 || Kitt Peak || Spacewatch || — || align=right | 1.2 km || 
|-id=028 bgcolor=#E9E9E9
| 305028 ||  || — || October 15, 2007 || Catalina || CSS || — || align=right | 2.4 km || 
|-id=029 bgcolor=#fefefe
| 305029 ||  || — || October 15, 2007 || Kitt Peak || Spacewatch || NYS || align=right | 1.0 km || 
|-id=030 bgcolor=#E9E9E9
| 305030 ||  || — || October 15, 2007 || Kitt Peak || Spacewatch || — || align=right | 1.1 km || 
|-id=031 bgcolor=#E9E9E9
| 305031 ||  || — || October 15, 2007 || Catalina || CSS || EUN || align=right | 1.8 km || 
|-id=032 bgcolor=#E9E9E9
| 305032 ||  || — || October 8, 2007 || Kitt Peak || Spacewatch || — || align=right | 1.8 km || 
|-id=033 bgcolor=#E9E9E9
| 305033 ||  || — || October 14, 2007 || Mount Lemmon || Mount Lemmon Survey || — || align=right data-sort-value="0.99" | 990 m || 
|-id=034 bgcolor=#E9E9E9
| 305034 ||  || — || October 11, 2007 || Catalina || CSS || HNS || align=right | 1.5 km || 
|-id=035 bgcolor=#E9E9E9
| 305035 ||  || — || October 14, 2007 || Mount Lemmon || Mount Lemmon Survey || — || align=right | 1.5 km || 
|-id=036 bgcolor=#E9E9E9
| 305036 ||  || — || October 8, 2007 || Kitt Peak || Spacewatch || — || align=right | 1.7 km || 
|-id=037 bgcolor=#E9E9E9
| 305037 ||  || — || October 8, 2007 || Mount Lemmon || Mount Lemmon Survey || — || align=right | 1.4 km || 
|-id=038 bgcolor=#E9E9E9
| 305038 ||  || — || October 9, 2007 || Kitt Peak || Spacewatch || — || align=right | 1.3 km || 
|-id=039 bgcolor=#fefefe
| 305039 ||  || — || October 8, 2007 || Catalina || CSS || — || align=right | 1.1 km || 
|-id=040 bgcolor=#E9E9E9
| 305040 ||  || — || October 13, 2007 || Mount Lemmon || Mount Lemmon Survey || — || align=right | 1.2 km || 
|-id=041 bgcolor=#fefefe
| 305041 ||  || — || October 9, 2007 || Kitt Peak || Spacewatch || — || align=right | 1.1 km || 
|-id=042 bgcolor=#E9E9E9
| 305042 ||  || — || October 10, 2007 || Kitt Peak || Spacewatch || — || align=right | 1.8 km || 
|-id=043 bgcolor=#fefefe
| 305043 ||  || — || October 16, 2007 || Bisei SG Center || BATTeRS || — || align=right data-sort-value="0.99" | 990 m || 
|-id=044 bgcolor=#fefefe
| 305044 ||  || — || October 16, 2007 || Catalina || CSS || — || align=right | 1.1 km || 
|-id=045 bgcolor=#fefefe
| 305045 ||  || — || October 16, 2007 || Mount Lemmon || Mount Lemmon Survey || NYS || align=right data-sort-value="0.90" | 900 m || 
|-id=046 bgcolor=#fefefe
| 305046 ||  || — || October 18, 2007 || Mount Lemmon || Mount Lemmon Survey || NYS || align=right data-sort-value="0.83" | 830 m || 
|-id=047 bgcolor=#E9E9E9
| 305047 ||  || — || October 16, 2007 || Kitt Peak || Spacewatch || RAF || align=right | 1.4 km || 
|-id=048 bgcolor=#E9E9E9
| 305048 ||  || — || October 16, 2007 || Kitt Peak || Spacewatch || — || align=right | 1.2 km || 
|-id=049 bgcolor=#E9E9E9
| 305049 ||  || — || October 16, 2007 || Kitt Peak || Spacewatch || MIS || align=right | 2.9 km || 
|-id=050 bgcolor=#E9E9E9
| 305050 ||  || — || October 16, 2007 || Kitt Peak || Spacewatch || — || align=right | 1.2 km || 
|-id=051 bgcolor=#E9E9E9
| 305051 ||  || — || October 16, 2007 || Mount Lemmon || Mount Lemmon Survey || — || align=right | 1.3 km || 
|-id=052 bgcolor=#E9E9E9
| 305052 ||  || — || October 16, 2007 || Kitt Peak || Spacewatch || — || align=right | 1.3 km || 
|-id=053 bgcolor=#E9E9E9
| 305053 ||  || — || October 30, 2007 || Mount Lemmon || Mount Lemmon Survey || — || align=right data-sort-value="0.98" | 980 m || 
|-id=054 bgcolor=#E9E9E9
| 305054 ||  || — || October 30, 2007 || Mount Lemmon || Mount Lemmon Survey || — || align=right | 1.8 km || 
|-id=055 bgcolor=#E9E9E9
| 305055 ||  || — || October 30, 2007 || Mount Lemmon || Mount Lemmon Survey || — || align=right data-sort-value="0.79" | 790 m || 
|-id=056 bgcolor=#fefefe
| 305056 ||  || — || October 30, 2007 || Catalina || CSS || NYS || align=right data-sort-value="0.73" | 730 m || 
|-id=057 bgcolor=#E9E9E9
| 305057 ||  || — || October 31, 2007 || Kitt Peak || Spacewatch || — || align=right | 1.1 km || 
|-id=058 bgcolor=#E9E9E9
| 305058 ||  || — || October 31, 2007 || Mount Lemmon || Mount Lemmon Survey || — || align=right data-sort-value="0.87" | 870 m || 
|-id=059 bgcolor=#E9E9E9
| 305059 ||  || — || October 31, 2007 || Mount Lemmon || Mount Lemmon Survey || — || align=right | 1.8 km || 
|-id=060 bgcolor=#E9E9E9
| 305060 ||  || — || October 30, 2007 || Kitt Peak || Spacewatch || — || align=right | 1.3 km || 
|-id=061 bgcolor=#E9E9E9
| 305061 ||  || — || October 31, 2007 || Mount Lemmon || Mount Lemmon Survey || — || align=right | 2.4 km || 
|-id=062 bgcolor=#E9E9E9
| 305062 ||  || — || October 30, 2007 || Kitt Peak || Spacewatch || EUN || align=right | 1.5 km || 
|-id=063 bgcolor=#E9E9E9
| 305063 ||  || — || October 30, 2007 || Kitt Peak || Spacewatch || AER || align=right | 1.6 km || 
|-id=064 bgcolor=#E9E9E9
| 305064 ||  || — || October 30, 2007 || Kitt Peak || Spacewatch || — || align=right | 2.5 km || 
|-id=065 bgcolor=#E9E9E9
| 305065 ||  || — || October 30, 2007 || Kitt Peak || Spacewatch || — || align=right | 3.2 km || 
|-id=066 bgcolor=#E9E9E9
| 305066 ||  || — || October 30, 2007 || Kitt Peak || Spacewatch || — || align=right | 1.0 km || 
|-id=067 bgcolor=#E9E9E9
| 305067 ||  || — || October 30, 2007 || Kitt Peak || Spacewatch || — || align=right data-sort-value="0.98" | 980 m || 
|-id=068 bgcolor=#E9E9E9
| 305068 ||  || — || October 30, 2007 || Kitt Peak || Spacewatch || — || align=right | 1.5 km || 
|-id=069 bgcolor=#E9E9E9
| 305069 ||  || — || October 30, 2007 || Kitt Peak || Spacewatch || RAF || align=right | 1.5 km || 
|-id=070 bgcolor=#E9E9E9
| 305070 ||  || — || October 30, 2007 || Kitt Peak || Spacewatch || — || align=right | 1.1 km || 
|-id=071 bgcolor=#E9E9E9
| 305071 ||  || — || October 30, 2007 || Kitt Peak || Spacewatch || HEN || align=right | 1.2 km || 
|-id=072 bgcolor=#E9E9E9
| 305072 ||  || — || October 30, 2007 || Kitt Peak || Spacewatch || — || align=right | 1.3 km || 
|-id=073 bgcolor=#E9E9E9
| 305073 ||  || — || October 30, 2007 || Kitt Peak || Spacewatch || — || align=right | 1.9 km || 
|-id=074 bgcolor=#E9E9E9
| 305074 ||  || — || October 30, 2007 || Kitt Peak || Spacewatch || MAR || align=right | 1.7 km || 
|-id=075 bgcolor=#E9E9E9
| 305075 ||  || — || October 30, 2007 || Kitt Peak || Spacewatch || EUN || align=right | 1.4 km || 
|-id=076 bgcolor=#E9E9E9
| 305076 ||  || — || October 31, 2007 || Mount Lemmon || Mount Lemmon Survey || — || align=right | 2.0 km || 
|-id=077 bgcolor=#E9E9E9
| 305077 ||  || — || October 30, 2007 || Kitt Peak || Spacewatch || MIS || align=right | 2.8 km || 
|-id=078 bgcolor=#E9E9E9
| 305078 ||  || — || October 30, 2007 || Mount Lemmon || Mount Lemmon Survey || EUN || align=right | 1.3 km || 
|-id=079 bgcolor=#E9E9E9
| 305079 ||  || — || October 31, 2007 || Kitt Peak || Spacewatch || HNS || align=right | 1.6 km || 
|-id=080 bgcolor=#E9E9E9
| 305080 ||  || — || October 30, 2007 || Kitt Peak || Spacewatch || AER || align=right | 1.9 km || 
|-id=081 bgcolor=#fefefe
| 305081 ||  || — || October 30, 2007 || Mount Lemmon || Mount Lemmon Survey || — || align=right data-sort-value="0.89" | 890 m || 
|-id=082 bgcolor=#E9E9E9
| 305082 ||  || — || October 21, 2007 || Mount Lemmon || Mount Lemmon Survey || — || align=right | 2.1 km || 
|-id=083 bgcolor=#E9E9E9
| 305083 ||  || — || October 16, 2007 || Mount Lemmon || Mount Lemmon Survey || — || align=right | 1.3 km || 
|-id=084 bgcolor=#E9E9E9
| 305084 ||  || — || October 20, 2007 || Mount Lemmon || Mount Lemmon Survey || — || align=right | 1.9 km || 
|-id=085 bgcolor=#E9E9E9
| 305085 ||  || — || October 16, 2007 || Mount Lemmon || Mount Lemmon Survey || — || align=right | 1.5 km || 
|-id=086 bgcolor=#E9E9E9
| 305086 ||  || — || October 16, 2007 || Catalina || CSS || — || align=right | 2.3 km || 
|-id=087 bgcolor=#E9E9E9
| 305087 ||  || — || October 21, 2007 || Catalina || CSS || — || align=right | 1.4 km || 
|-id=088 bgcolor=#E9E9E9
| 305088 ||  || — || October 21, 2007 || Mount Lemmon || Mount Lemmon Survey || — || align=right | 1.5 km || 
|-id=089 bgcolor=#E9E9E9
| 305089 ||  || — || November 2, 2007 || Pla D'Arguines || R. Ferrando || — || align=right | 1.7 km || 
|-id=090 bgcolor=#FFC2E0
| 305090 ||  || — || November 3, 2007 || Socorro || LINEAR || AMO +1km || align=right | 2.0 km || 
|-id=091 bgcolor=#E9E9E9
| 305091 ||  || — || November 5, 2007 || Catalina || CSS || — || align=right | 1.9 km || 
|-id=092 bgcolor=#fefefe
| 305092 ||  || — || November 1, 2007 || Mount Lemmon || Mount Lemmon Survey || MAS || align=right data-sort-value="0.96" | 960 m || 
|-id=093 bgcolor=#E9E9E9
| 305093 ||  || — || November 1, 2007 || Mount Lemmon || Mount Lemmon Survey || — || align=right data-sort-value="0.88" | 880 m || 
|-id=094 bgcolor=#E9E9E9
| 305094 ||  || — || November 1, 2007 || Kitt Peak || Spacewatch || — || align=right | 1.8 km || 
|-id=095 bgcolor=#E9E9E9
| 305095 ||  || — || November 2, 2007 || Kitt Peak || Spacewatch || WIT || align=right | 1.1 km || 
|-id=096 bgcolor=#E9E9E9
| 305096 ||  || — || November 2, 2007 || Catalina || CSS || — || align=right | 1.4 km || 
|-id=097 bgcolor=#d6d6d6
| 305097 ||  || — || November 3, 2007 || Mount Lemmon || Mount Lemmon Survey || — || align=right | 4.0 km || 
|-id=098 bgcolor=#E9E9E9
| 305098 ||  || — || November 1, 2007 || Kitt Peak || Spacewatch || — || align=right | 1.7 km || 
|-id=099 bgcolor=#E9E9E9
| 305099 ||  || — || November 1, 2007 || Kitt Peak || Spacewatch || — || align=right | 1.3 km || 
|-id=100 bgcolor=#E9E9E9
| 305100 ||  || — || November 1, 2007 || Kitt Peak || Spacewatch || — || align=right | 1.9 km || 
|}

305101–305200 

|-bgcolor=#E9E9E9
| 305101 ||  || — || November 1, 2007 || Kitt Peak || Spacewatch || — || align=right | 2.0 km || 
|-id=102 bgcolor=#E9E9E9
| 305102 ||  || — || November 1, 2007 || Kitt Peak || Spacewatch || — || align=right | 1.6 km || 
|-id=103 bgcolor=#E9E9E9
| 305103 ||  || — || November 1, 2007 || Kitt Peak || Spacewatch || — || align=right | 1.9 km || 
|-id=104 bgcolor=#E9E9E9
| 305104 ||  || — || November 1, 2007 || Kitt Peak || Spacewatch || — || align=right | 1.7 km || 
|-id=105 bgcolor=#E9E9E9
| 305105 ||  || — || November 1, 2007 || Kitt Peak || Spacewatch || — || align=right | 1.6 km || 
|-id=106 bgcolor=#E9E9E9
| 305106 ||  || — || November 1, 2007 || Kitt Peak || Spacewatch || — || align=right | 2.0 km || 
|-id=107 bgcolor=#E9E9E9
| 305107 ||  || — || November 1, 2007 || Kitt Peak || Spacewatch || — || align=right | 1.2 km || 
|-id=108 bgcolor=#E9E9E9
| 305108 ||  || — || November 1, 2007 || Kitt Peak || Spacewatch || — || align=right | 1.1 km || 
|-id=109 bgcolor=#E9E9E9
| 305109 ||  || — || November 1, 2007 || Kitt Peak || Spacewatch || — || align=right | 1.4 km || 
|-id=110 bgcolor=#E9E9E9
| 305110 ||  || — || November 1, 2007 || Kitt Peak || Spacewatch || — || align=right | 1.9 km || 
|-id=111 bgcolor=#E9E9E9
| 305111 ||  || — || November 3, 2007 || Kitt Peak || Spacewatch || KON || align=right | 3.0 km || 
|-id=112 bgcolor=#E9E9E9
| 305112 ||  || — || November 3, 2007 || Kitt Peak || Spacewatch || — || align=right | 1.4 km || 
|-id=113 bgcolor=#E9E9E9
| 305113 ||  || — || November 4, 2007 || Mount Lemmon || Mount Lemmon Survey || — || align=right | 2.5 km || 
|-id=114 bgcolor=#E9E9E9
| 305114 ||  || — || November 2, 2007 || Socorro || LINEAR || — || align=right | 3.4 km || 
|-id=115 bgcolor=#E9E9E9
| 305115 ||  || — || November 4, 2007 || Socorro || LINEAR || — || align=right | 2.8 km || 
|-id=116 bgcolor=#E9E9E9
| 305116 ||  || — || November 5, 2007 || Socorro || LINEAR || — || align=right | 1.2 km || 
|-id=117 bgcolor=#E9E9E9
| 305117 ||  || — || November 6, 2007 || Needville || Needville Obs. || — || align=right | 1.6 km || 
|-id=118 bgcolor=#E9E9E9
| 305118 ||  || — || November 8, 2007 || Socorro || LINEAR || — || align=right | 2.2 km || 
|-id=119 bgcolor=#E9E9E9
| 305119 ||  || — || November 1, 2007 || Kitt Peak || Spacewatch || — || align=right | 4.1 km || 
|-id=120 bgcolor=#E9E9E9
| 305120 ||  || — || November 2, 2007 || Kitt Peak || Spacewatch || — || align=right data-sort-value="0.98" | 980 m || 
|-id=121 bgcolor=#E9E9E9
| 305121 ||  || — || November 2, 2007 || Kitt Peak || Spacewatch || — || align=right | 1.6 km || 
|-id=122 bgcolor=#E9E9E9
| 305122 ||  || — || November 3, 2007 || Kitt Peak || Spacewatch || — || align=right | 2.5 km || 
|-id=123 bgcolor=#E9E9E9
| 305123 ||  || — || November 3, 2007 || Kitt Peak || Spacewatch || EUN || align=right | 2.0 km || 
|-id=124 bgcolor=#E9E9E9
| 305124 ||  || — || November 3, 2007 || Kitt Peak || Spacewatch || — || align=right | 1.3 km || 
|-id=125 bgcolor=#E9E9E9
| 305125 ||  || — || November 5, 2007 || Kitt Peak || Spacewatch || — || align=right | 1.9 km || 
|-id=126 bgcolor=#E9E9E9
| 305126 ||  || — || November 3, 2007 || Mount Lemmon || Mount Lemmon Survey || — || align=right | 1.9 km || 
|-id=127 bgcolor=#E9E9E9
| 305127 ||  || — || November 3, 2007 || Kitt Peak || Spacewatch || — || align=right | 1.7 km || 
|-id=128 bgcolor=#E9E9E9
| 305128 ||  || — || November 4, 2007 || Kitt Peak || Spacewatch || — || align=right | 1.9 km || 
|-id=129 bgcolor=#E9E9E9
| 305129 ||  || — || November 4, 2007 || Kitt Peak || Spacewatch || — || align=right | 1.4 km || 
|-id=130 bgcolor=#E9E9E9
| 305130 ||  || — || November 4, 2007 || Kitt Peak || Spacewatch || — || align=right | 1.6 km || 
|-id=131 bgcolor=#E9E9E9
| 305131 ||  || — || November 4, 2007 || Kitt Peak || Spacewatch || RAF || align=right | 1.3 km || 
|-id=132 bgcolor=#E9E9E9
| 305132 ||  || — || November 4, 2007 || Kitt Peak || Spacewatch || HEN || align=right | 1.1 km || 
|-id=133 bgcolor=#E9E9E9
| 305133 ||  || — || November 4, 2007 || Kitt Peak || Spacewatch || WIT || align=right | 1.4 km || 
|-id=134 bgcolor=#E9E9E9
| 305134 ||  || — || November 2, 2007 || Kitt Peak || Spacewatch || — || align=right | 1.8 km || 
|-id=135 bgcolor=#E9E9E9
| 305135 ||  || — || November 5, 2007 || Kitt Peak || Spacewatch || — || align=right | 1.4 km || 
|-id=136 bgcolor=#E9E9E9
| 305136 ||  || — || November 5, 2007 || Kitt Peak || Spacewatch || — || align=right | 2.0 km || 
|-id=137 bgcolor=#E9E9E9
| 305137 ||  || — || March 4, 1997 || Kitt Peak || Spacewatch || — || align=right | 1.9 km || 
|-id=138 bgcolor=#E9E9E9
| 305138 ||  || — || November 5, 2007 || Kitt Peak || Spacewatch || — || align=right | 2.2 km || 
|-id=139 bgcolor=#E9E9E9
| 305139 ||  || — || November 5, 2007 || Kitt Peak || Spacewatch || — || align=right | 1.0 km || 
|-id=140 bgcolor=#E9E9E9
| 305140 ||  || — || November 5, 2007 || Kitt Peak || Spacewatch || GER || align=right | 1.4 km || 
|-id=141 bgcolor=#E9E9E9
| 305141 ||  || — || November 5, 2007 || Kitt Peak || Spacewatch || — || align=right data-sort-value="0.97" | 970 m || 
|-id=142 bgcolor=#fefefe
| 305142 ||  || — || November 7, 2007 || Kitt Peak || Spacewatch || V || align=right data-sort-value="0.85" | 850 m || 
|-id=143 bgcolor=#E9E9E9
| 305143 ||  || — || November 2, 2007 || Mount Lemmon || Mount Lemmon Survey || — || align=right | 1.3 km || 
|-id=144 bgcolor=#fefefe
| 305144 ||  || — || November 5, 2007 || Mount Lemmon || Mount Lemmon Survey || — || align=right data-sort-value="0.77" | 770 m || 
|-id=145 bgcolor=#E9E9E9
| 305145 ||  || — || November 6, 2007 || Purple Mountain || PMO NEO || MAR || align=right | 1.3 km || 
|-id=146 bgcolor=#E9E9E9
| 305146 ||  || — || November 12, 2007 || Bisei SG Center || BATTeRS || MAR || align=right | 1.5 km || 
|-id=147 bgcolor=#d6d6d6
| 305147 ||  || — || November 4, 2007 || Mount Lemmon || Mount Lemmon Survey || CHA || align=right | 2.5 km || 
|-id=148 bgcolor=#fefefe
| 305148 ||  || — || November 7, 2007 || Mount Lemmon || Mount Lemmon Survey || — || align=right data-sort-value="0.92" | 920 m || 
|-id=149 bgcolor=#E9E9E9
| 305149 ||  || — || November 8, 2007 || Mount Lemmon || Mount Lemmon Survey || XIZ || align=right | 1.4 km || 
|-id=150 bgcolor=#E9E9E9
| 305150 ||  || — || November 6, 2007 || Mount Lemmon || Mount Lemmon Survey || — || align=right | 2.2 km || 
|-id=151 bgcolor=#E9E9E9
| 305151 ||  || — || November 7, 2007 || Kitt Peak || Spacewatch || — || align=right | 1.1 km || 
|-id=152 bgcolor=#E9E9E9
| 305152 ||  || — || November 7, 2007 || Kitt Peak || Spacewatch || — || align=right | 1.0 km || 
|-id=153 bgcolor=#E9E9E9
| 305153 ||  || — || November 9, 2007 || Kitt Peak || Spacewatch || — || align=right | 1.0 km || 
|-id=154 bgcolor=#E9E9E9
| 305154 ||  || — || November 9, 2007 || Kitt Peak || Spacewatch || — || align=right | 3.2 km || 
|-id=155 bgcolor=#E9E9E9
| 305155 ||  || — || November 9, 2007 || Kitt Peak || Spacewatch || — || align=right | 1.1 km || 
|-id=156 bgcolor=#E9E9E9
| 305156 ||  || — || November 9, 2007 || Kitt Peak || Spacewatch || — || align=right | 1.1 km || 
|-id=157 bgcolor=#E9E9E9
| 305157 ||  || — || November 9, 2007 || Kitt Peak || Spacewatch || — || align=right | 4.4 km || 
|-id=158 bgcolor=#E9E9E9
| 305158 ||  || — || November 9, 2007 || Kitt Peak || Spacewatch || WIT || align=right | 1.3 km || 
|-id=159 bgcolor=#E9E9E9
| 305159 ||  || — || November 12, 2007 || Mount Lemmon || Mount Lemmon Survey || — || align=right | 1.4 km || 
|-id=160 bgcolor=#E9E9E9
| 305160 ||  || — || November 14, 2007 || Bisei SG Center || BATTeRS || — || align=right | 1.1 km || 
|-id=161 bgcolor=#E9E9E9
| 305161 ||  || — || November 6, 2007 || Purple Mountain || PMO NEO || — || align=right | 2.1 km || 
|-id=162 bgcolor=#E9E9E9
| 305162 ||  || — || November 12, 2007 || Catalina || CSS || — || align=right | 1.3 km || 
|-id=163 bgcolor=#E9E9E9
| 305163 ||  || — || November 9, 2007 || Kitt Peak || Spacewatch || HEN || align=right | 1.0 km || 
|-id=164 bgcolor=#E9E9E9
| 305164 ||  || — || November 13, 2007 || Kitt Peak || Spacewatch || — || align=right | 2.9 km || 
|-id=165 bgcolor=#E9E9E9
| 305165 ||  || — || November 13, 2007 || Catalina || CSS || EUN || align=right | 1.7 km || 
|-id=166 bgcolor=#E9E9E9
| 305166 ||  || — || November 15, 2007 || Anderson Mesa || LONEOS || — || align=right | 2.0 km || 
|-id=167 bgcolor=#E9E9E9
| 305167 ||  || — || November 13, 2007 || Kitt Peak || Spacewatch || — || align=right | 1.9 km || 
|-id=168 bgcolor=#E9E9E9
| 305168 ||  || — || November 14, 2007 || Kitt Peak || Spacewatch || — || align=right | 1.6 km || 
|-id=169 bgcolor=#E9E9E9
| 305169 ||  || — || November 14, 2007 || Socorro || LINEAR || — || align=right | 1.2 km || 
|-id=170 bgcolor=#E9E9E9
| 305170 ||  || — || November 14, 2007 || Kitt Peak || Spacewatch || — || align=right | 1.7 km || 
|-id=171 bgcolor=#E9E9E9
| 305171 ||  || — || November 14, 2007 || Kitt Peak || Spacewatch || — || align=right data-sort-value="0.98" | 980 m || 
|-id=172 bgcolor=#E9E9E9
| 305172 ||  || — || November 14, 2007 || Kitt Peak || Spacewatch || — || align=right data-sort-value="0.82" | 820 m || 
|-id=173 bgcolor=#E9E9E9
| 305173 ||  || — || November 14, 2007 || Kitt Peak || Spacewatch || — || align=right | 1.5 km || 
|-id=174 bgcolor=#E9E9E9
| 305174 ||  || — || November 14, 2007 || Kitt Peak || Spacewatch || — || align=right | 1.5 km || 
|-id=175 bgcolor=#E9E9E9
| 305175 ||  || — || November 14, 2007 || Kitt Peak || Spacewatch || — || align=right | 1.5 km || 
|-id=176 bgcolor=#E9E9E9
| 305176 ||  || — || November 14, 2007 || Kitt Peak || Spacewatch || — || align=right | 2.4 km || 
|-id=177 bgcolor=#E9E9E9
| 305177 ||  || — || November 14, 2007 || Kitt Peak || Spacewatch || — || align=right | 3.1 km || 
|-id=178 bgcolor=#E9E9E9
| 305178 ||  || — || July 16, 2002 || Palomar || NEAT || — || align=right | 2.1 km || 
|-id=179 bgcolor=#E9E9E9
| 305179 ||  || — || November 14, 2007 || Mount Lemmon || Mount Lemmon Survey || KON || align=right | 2.8 km || 
|-id=180 bgcolor=#E9E9E9
| 305180 ||  || — || November 11, 2007 || Catalina || CSS || — || align=right | 1.3 km || 
|-id=181 bgcolor=#E9E9E9
| 305181 Donelaitis ||  ||  || November 5, 2007 || Moletai || K. Černis || KON || align=right | 3.6 km || 
|-id=182 bgcolor=#E9E9E9
| 305182 ||  || — || November 2, 2007 || Mount Lemmon || Mount Lemmon Survey || — || align=right | 2.9 km || 
|-id=183 bgcolor=#E9E9E9
| 305183 ||  || — || November 2, 2007 || Mount Lemmon || Mount Lemmon Survey || — || align=right | 1.7 km || 
|-id=184 bgcolor=#E9E9E9
| 305184 ||  || — || November 8, 2007 || Kitt Peak || Spacewatch || — || align=right | 1.6 km || 
|-id=185 bgcolor=#E9E9E9
| 305185 ||  || — || November 14, 2007 || Kitt Peak || Spacewatch || PAD || align=right | 2.2 km || 
|-id=186 bgcolor=#d6d6d6
| 305186 ||  || — || November 3, 2007 || Mount Lemmon || Mount Lemmon Survey || — || align=right | 4.2 km || 
|-id=187 bgcolor=#E9E9E9
| 305187 ||  || — || November 2, 2007 || Kitt Peak || Spacewatch || NEM || align=right | 2.7 km || 
|-id=188 bgcolor=#E9E9E9
| 305188 ||  || — || November 7, 2007 || Kitt Peak || Spacewatch || — || align=right data-sort-value="0.94" | 940 m || 
|-id=189 bgcolor=#d6d6d6
| 305189 ||  || — || November 5, 2007 || Mount Lemmon || Mount Lemmon Survey || KOR || align=right | 1.9 km || 
|-id=190 bgcolor=#E9E9E9
| 305190 ||  || — || November 4, 2007 || Socorro || LINEAR || — || align=right | 3.0 km || 
|-id=191 bgcolor=#E9E9E9
| 305191 ||  || — || November 4, 2007 || Socorro || LINEAR || MAR || align=right | 1.5 km || 
|-id=192 bgcolor=#E9E9E9
| 305192 ||  || — || November 5, 2007 || Socorro || LINEAR || — || align=right | 1.1 km || 
|-id=193 bgcolor=#E9E9E9
| 305193 ||  || — || November 2, 2007 || Kitt Peak || Spacewatch || — || align=right | 1.6 km || 
|-id=194 bgcolor=#E9E9E9
| 305194 ||  || — || November 2, 2007 || Socorro || LINEAR || AER || align=right | 1.9 km || 
|-id=195 bgcolor=#E9E9E9
| 305195 ||  || — || November 3, 2007 || Kitt Peak || Spacewatch || — || align=right | 1.4 km || 
|-id=196 bgcolor=#E9E9E9
| 305196 ||  || — || November 4, 2007 || Socorro || LINEAR || EUN || align=right | 1.4 km || 
|-id=197 bgcolor=#E9E9E9
| 305197 ||  || — || November 9, 2007 || Kitt Peak || Spacewatch || — || align=right | 1.3 km || 
|-id=198 bgcolor=#E9E9E9
| 305198 ||  || — || November 5, 2007 || Mount Lemmon || Mount Lemmon Survey || — || align=right | 2.5 km || 
|-id=199 bgcolor=#E9E9E9
| 305199 ||  || — || November 11, 2007 || Mount Lemmon || Mount Lemmon Survey || — || align=right | 2.8 km || 
|-id=200 bgcolor=#E9E9E9
| 305200 ||  || — || November 14, 2007 || Mount Lemmon || Mount Lemmon Survey || — || align=right | 2.0 km || 
|}

305201–305300 

|-bgcolor=#E9E9E9
| 305201 || 2007 WY || — || November 16, 2007 || Dauban || Chante-Perdrix Obs. || — || align=right | 1.0 km || 
|-id=202 bgcolor=#E9E9E9
| 305202 ||  || — || November 17, 2007 || Majorca || OAM Obs. || — || align=right | 1.0 km || 
|-id=203 bgcolor=#E9E9E9
| 305203 ||  || — || November 18, 2007 || Socorro || LINEAR || EUN || align=right | 1.7 km || 
|-id=204 bgcolor=#E9E9E9
| 305204 ||  || — || November 17, 2007 || Catalina || CSS || — || align=right | 2.3 km || 
|-id=205 bgcolor=#E9E9E9
| 305205 ||  || — || November 18, 2007 || Mount Lemmon || Mount Lemmon Survey || — || align=right | 1.7 km || 
|-id=206 bgcolor=#E9E9E9
| 305206 ||  || — || November 18, 2007 || Mount Lemmon || Mount Lemmon Survey || — || align=right | 1.9 km || 
|-id=207 bgcolor=#d6d6d6
| 305207 ||  || — || November 18, 2007 || Mount Lemmon || Mount Lemmon Survey || — || align=right | 3.4 km || 
|-id=208 bgcolor=#E9E9E9
| 305208 ||  || — || November 18, 2007 || Mount Lemmon || Mount Lemmon Survey || — || align=right | 1.0 km || 
|-id=209 bgcolor=#E9E9E9
| 305209 ||  || — || November 18, 2007 || Mount Lemmon || Mount Lemmon Survey || — || align=right | 1.3 km || 
|-id=210 bgcolor=#E9E9E9
| 305210 ||  || — || November 19, 2007 || Kitt Peak || Spacewatch || — || align=right | 2.5 km || 
|-id=211 bgcolor=#E9E9E9
| 305211 ||  || — || November 19, 2007 || Kitt Peak || Spacewatch || — || align=right | 2.1 km || 
|-id=212 bgcolor=#E9E9E9
| 305212 ||  || — || November 17, 2007 || Catalina || CSS || — || align=right | 2.5 km || 
|-id=213 bgcolor=#E9E9E9
| 305213 ||  || — || November 20, 2007 || Mount Lemmon || Mount Lemmon Survey || — || align=right | 2.0 km || 
|-id=214 bgcolor=#E9E9E9
| 305214 ||  || — || November 20, 2007 || Mount Lemmon || Mount Lemmon Survey || — || align=right | 2.2 km || 
|-id=215 bgcolor=#E9E9E9
| 305215 ||  || — || November 28, 2007 || Purple Mountain || PMO NEO || EUN || align=right | 2.0 km || 
|-id=216 bgcolor=#E9E9E9
| 305216 ||  || — || November 19, 2007 || Mount Lemmon || Mount Lemmon Survey || — || align=right | 2.0 km || 
|-id=217 bgcolor=#E9E9E9
| 305217 ||  || — || November 16, 2007 || Mount Lemmon || Mount Lemmon Survey || — || align=right | 1.0 km || 
|-id=218 bgcolor=#E9E9E9
| 305218 ||  || — || November 19, 2007 || Kitt Peak || Spacewatch || — || align=right | 2.0 km || 
|-id=219 bgcolor=#d6d6d6
| 305219 ||  || — || November 19, 2007 || Mount Lemmon || Mount Lemmon Survey || EOS || align=right | 2.3 km || 
|-id=220 bgcolor=#E9E9E9
| 305220 ||  || — || April 13, 2005 || Catalina || CSS || HNS || align=right | 1.4 km || 
|-id=221 bgcolor=#E9E9E9
| 305221 ||  || — || December 1, 2007 || Pla D'Arguines || R. Ferrando || RAF || align=right | 1.1 km || 
|-id=222 bgcolor=#E9E9E9
| 305222 ||  || — || December 3, 2007 || Catalina || CSS || — || align=right | 1.3 km || 
|-id=223 bgcolor=#E9E9E9
| 305223 ||  || — || December 3, 2007 || Calvin-Rehoboth || Calvin–Rehoboth Obs. || — || align=right | 1.1 km || 
|-id=224 bgcolor=#E9E9E9
| 305224 ||  || — || December 4, 2007 || Mount Lemmon || Mount Lemmon Survey || — || align=right | 3.7 km || 
|-id=225 bgcolor=#E9E9E9
| 305225 ||  || — || December 3, 2007 || Goodricke-Pigott || R. A. Tucker || RAF || align=right | 1.1 km || 
|-id=226 bgcolor=#E9E9E9
| 305226 ||  || — || December 4, 2007 || Kitt Peak || Spacewatch || — || align=right | 2.7 km || 
|-id=227 bgcolor=#E9E9E9
| 305227 ||  || — || December 5, 2007 || Kitt Peak || Spacewatch || NEM || align=right | 2.3 km || 
|-id=228 bgcolor=#E9E9E9
| 305228 ||  || — || December 5, 2007 || Catalina || CSS || NEM || align=right | 2.4 km || 
|-id=229 bgcolor=#E9E9E9
| 305229 ||  || — || December 7, 2007 || Bisei SG Center || BATTeRS || — || align=right | 2.8 km || 
|-id=230 bgcolor=#E9E9E9
| 305230 ||  || — || December 12, 2007 || Costitx || OAM Obs. || — || align=right | 1.5 km || 
|-id=231 bgcolor=#E9E9E9
| 305231 ||  || — || December 13, 2007 || Costitx || OAM Obs. || — || align=right | 3.3 km || 
|-id=232 bgcolor=#E9E9E9
| 305232 ||  || — || December 12, 2007 || Socorro || LINEAR || — || align=right | 1.4 km || 
|-id=233 bgcolor=#d6d6d6
| 305233 ||  || — || December 12, 2007 || Socorro || LINEAR || CHA || align=right | 2.6 km || 
|-id=234 bgcolor=#d6d6d6
| 305234 ||  || — || December 12, 2007 || La Sagra || OAM Obs. || — || align=right | 2.9 km || 
|-id=235 bgcolor=#E9E9E9
| 305235 ||  || — || December 4, 2007 || Catalina || CSS || — || align=right | 3.3 km || 
|-id=236 bgcolor=#E9E9E9
| 305236 ||  || — || December 14, 2007 || La Sagra || OAM Obs. || — || align=right | 2.6 km || 
|-id=237 bgcolor=#E9E9E9
| 305237 ||  || — || November 9, 2007 || Kitt Peak || Spacewatch || — || align=right | 1.1 km || 
|-id=238 bgcolor=#E9E9E9
| 305238 Maxuehui ||  ||  || December 15, 2007 || Lulin || Y.-C. Cheng || AGN || align=right | 1.4 km || 
|-id=239 bgcolor=#E9E9E9
| 305239 ||  || — || December 15, 2007 || Catalina || CSS || — || align=right | 2.1 km || 
|-id=240 bgcolor=#E9E9E9
| 305240 ||  || — || December 15, 2007 || Kitt Peak || Spacewatch || HNA || align=right | 1.8 km || 
|-id=241 bgcolor=#E9E9E9
| 305241 ||  || — || December 15, 2007 || Mount Lemmon || Mount Lemmon Survey || — || align=right | 1.6 km || 
|-id=242 bgcolor=#E9E9E9
| 305242 ||  || — || December 15, 2007 || Catalina || CSS || INO || align=right | 1.4 km || 
|-id=243 bgcolor=#E9E9E9
| 305243 ||  || — || December 10, 2007 || Socorro || LINEAR || VIB || align=right | 2.5 km || 
|-id=244 bgcolor=#E9E9E9
| 305244 ||  || — || December 13, 2007 || Socorro || LINEAR || — || align=right | 1.8 km || 
|-id=245 bgcolor=#E9E9E9
| 305245 ||  || — || December 13, 2007 || Socorro || LINEAR || — || align=right | 2.7 km || 
|-id=246 bgcolor=#E9E9E9
| 305246 ||  || — || December 13, 2007 || Socorro || LINEAR || — || align=right | 3.5 km || 
|-id=247 bgcolor=#E9E9E9
| 305247 ||  || — || December 13, 2007 || Socorro || LINEAR || — || align=right | 3.3 km || 
|-id=248 bgcolor=#E9E9E9
| 305248 ||  || — || December 14, 2007 || Purple Mountain || PMO NEO || GEF || align=right | 1.6 km || 
|-id=249 bgcolor=#E9E9E9
| 305249 ||  || — || December 15, 2007 || Kitt Peak || Spacewatch || ADE || align=right | 3.0 km || 
|-id=250 bgcolor=#E9E9E9
| 305250 ||  || — || December 15, 2007 || Kitt Peak || Spacewatch || — || align=right | 1.8 km || 
|-id=251 bgcolor=#E9E9E9
| 305251 ||  || — || December 15, 2007 || Kitt Peak || Spacewatch || WIT || align=right | 1.2 km || 
|-id=252 bgcolor=#E9E9E9
| 305252 ||  || — || December 15, 2007 || Mount Lemmon || Mount Lemmon Survey || — || align=right | 1.9 km || 
|-id=253 bgcolor=#E9E9E9
| 305253 ||  || — || December 4, 2007 || Kitt Peak || Spacewatch || WIT || align=right | 1.4 km || 
|-id=254 bgcolor=#E9E9E9
| 305254 Moron ||  ||  || December 19, 2007 || Nogales || M. Ory || AGN || align=right | 1.4 km || 
|-id=255 bgcolor=#E9E9E9
| 305255 ||  || — || December 16, 2007 || Mount Lemmon || Mount Lemmon Survey || — || align=right | 1.7 km || 
|-id=256 bgcolor=#E9E9E9
| 305256 ||  || — || December 16, 2007 || Mount Lemmon || Mount Lemmon Survey || — || align=right | 1.9 km || 
|-id=257 bgcolor=#d6d6d6
| 305257 ||  || — || December 16, 2007 || Kitt Peak || Spacewatch || EOS || align=right | 2.7 km || 
|-id=258 bgcolor=#E9E9E9
| 305258 ||  || — || December 17, 2007 || Mount Lemmon || Mount Lemmon Survey || — || align=right | 2.7 km || 
|-id=259 bgcolor=#d6d6d6
| 305259 ||  || — || December 17, 2007 || Mount Lemmon || Mount Lemmon Survey || SAN || align=right | 1.9 km || 
|-id=260 bgcolor=#E9E9E9
| 305260 ||  || — || December 16, 2007 || Kitt Peak || Spacewatch || NEM || align=right | 2.8 km || 
|-id=261 bgcolor=#d6d6d6
| 305261 ||  || — || September 15, 2006 || Kitt Peak || Spacewatch || KOR || align=right | 1.5 km || 
|-id=262 bgcolor=#E9E9E9
| 305262 ||  || — || December 17, 2007 || Mount Lemmon || Mount Lemmon Survey || WIT || align=right | 1.3 km || 
|-id=263 bgcolor=#E9E9E9
| 305263 ||  || — || December 21, 2007 || Piszkéstető || K. Sárneczky || — || align=right | 2.1 km || 
|-id=264 bgcolor=#E9E9E9
| 305264 ||  || — || December 21, 2007 || Piszkéstető || K. Sárneczky || — || align=right | 4.5 km || 
|-id=265 bgcolor=#E9E9E9
| 305265 ||  || — || December 28, 2007 || Kitt Peak || Spacewatch || — || align=right | 1.5 km || 
|-id=266 bgcolor=#E9E9E9
| 305266 ||  || — || December 28, 2007 || Kitt Peak || Spacewatch || WIT || align=right | 1.5 km || 
|-id=267 bgcolor=#E9E9E9
| 305267 ||  || — || December 30, 2007 || Mount Lemmon || Mount Lemmon Survey || — || align=right | 2.7 km || 
|-id=268 bgcolor=#E9E9E9
| 305268 ||  || — || December 30, 2007 || Mount Lemmon || Mount Lemmon Survey || — || align=right | 2.5 km || 
|-id=269 bgcolor=#d6d6d6
| 305269 ||  || — || December 30, 2007 || Kitt Peak || Spacewatch || — || align=right | 3.0 km || 
|-id=270 bgcolor=#E9E9E9
| 305270 ||  || — || December 30, 2007 || Kitt Peak || Spacewatch || — || align=right | 1.9 km || 
|-id=271 bgcolor=#E9E9E9
| 305271 ||  || — || December 28, 2007 || Kitt Peak || Spacewatch || — || align=right | 1.4 km || 
|-id=272 bgcolor=#E9E9E9
| 305272 ||  || — || December 28, 2007 || Kitt Peak || Spacewatch || — || align=right | 2.2 km || 
|-id=273 bgcolor=#E9E9E9
| 305273 ||  || — || December 28, 2007 || Kitt Peak || Spacewatch || — || align=right | 3.0 km || 
|-id=274 bgcolor=#E9E9E9
| 305274 ||  || — || December 30, 2007 || Catalina || CSS || — || align=right | 2.5 km || 
|-id=275 bgcolor=#E9E9E9
| 305275 ||  || — || December 29, 2007 || Lulin || LUSS || GEF || align=right | 1.6 km || 
|-id=276 bgcolor=#E9E9E9
| 305276 ||  || — || March 16, 2004 || Kitt Peak || Spacewatch || — || align=right | 2.7 km || 
|-id=277 bgcolor=#E9E9E9
| 305277 ||  || — || December 30, 2007 || Catalina || CSS || — || align=right | 2.3 km || 
|-id=278 bgcolor=#E9E9E9
| 305278 ||  || — || December 28, 2007 || Kitt Peak || Spacewatch || HOF || align=right | 4.1 km || 
|-id=279 bgcolor=#E9E9E9
| 305279 ||  || — || December 31, 2007 || Kitt Peak || Spacewatch || — || align=right | 2.1 km || 
|-id=280 bgcolor=#d6d6d6
| 305280 ||  || — || December 31, 2007 || Kitt Peak || Spacewatch || EOS || align=right | 2.2 km || 
|-id=281 bgcolor=#d6d6d6
| 305281 ||  || — || December 18, 2007 || Mount Lemmon || Mount Lemmon Survey || — || align=right | 3.2 km || 
|-id=282 bgcolor=#E9E9E9
| 305282 ||  || — || December 16, 2007 || Kitt Peak || Spacewatch || NEM || align=right | 2.5 km || 
|-id=283 bgcolor=#d6d6d6
| 305283 ||  || — || December 30, 2007 || Kitt Peak || Spacewatch || KOR || align=right | 1.5 km || 
|-id=284 bgcolor=#E9E9E9
| 305284 ||  || — || December 16, 2007 || Mount Lemmon || Mount Lemmon Survey || — || align=right | 1.5 km || 
|-id=285 bgcolor=#E9E9E9
| 305285 ||  || — || January 1, 2008 || Kitt Peak || Spacewatch || — || align=right | 2.7 km || 
|-id=286 bgcolor=#E9E9E9
| 305286 ||  || — || January 1, 2008 || Bergisch Gladbach || W. Bickel || — || align=right | 1.9 km || 
|-id=287 bgcolor=#d6d6d6
| 305287 Olegyankov ||  ||  || January 6, 2008 || Zelenchukskaya || S. Korotkiy, T. V. Kryachko || — || align=right | 3.6 km || 
|-id=288 bgcolor=#E9E9E9
| 305288 ||  || — || January 5, 2008 || Purple Mountain || PMO NEO || JUN || align=right | 1.3 km || 
|-id=289 bgcolor=#d6d6d6
| 305289 ||  || — || January 8, 2008 || Dauban || F. Kugel || — || align=right | 3.2 km || 
|-id=290 bgcolor=#E9E9E9
| 305290 ||  || — || January 5, 2008 || Purple Mountain || PMO NEO || — || align=right | 1.4 km || 
|-id=291 bgcolor=#d6d6d6
| 305291 ||  || — || January 9, 2008 || Lulin || LUSS || — || align=right | 4.3 km || 
|-id=292 bgcolor=#E9E9E9
| 305292 ||  || — || January 10, 2008 || Mount Lemmon || Mount Lemmon Survey || — || align=right data-sort-value="0.87" | 870 m || 
|-id=293 bgcolor=#E9E9E9
| 305293 ||  || — || January 10, 2008 || Kitt Peak || Spacewatch || MIS || align=right | 3.0 km || 
|-id=294 bgcolor=#E9E9E9
| 305294 ||  || — || January 10, 2008 || Kitt Peak || Spacewatch || HEN || align=right | 1.1 km || 
|-id=295 bgcolor=#E9E9E9
| 305295 ||  || — || January 10, 2008 || Mount Lemmon || Mount Lemmon Survey || — || align=right | 1.6 km || 
|-id=296 bgcolor=#E9E9E9
| 305296 ||  || — || January 10, 2008 || Mount Lemmon || Mount Lemmon Survey || — || align=right | 2.5 km || 
|-id=297 bgcolor=#d6d6d6
| 305297 ||  || — || January 10, 2008 || Mount Lemmon || Mount Lemmon Survey || — || align=right | 3.5 km || 
|-id=298 bgcolor=#E9E9E9
| 305298 ||  || — || January 10, 2008 || Kitt Peak || Spacewatch || AGN || align=right | 1.4 km || 
|-id=299 bgcolor=#d6d6d6
| 305299 ||  || — || January 10, 2008 || Mount Lemmon || Mount Lemmon Survey || — || align=right | 3.6 km || 
|-id=300 bgcolor=#d6d6d6
| 305300 ||  || — || January 10, 2008 || Mount Lemmon || Mount Lemmon Survey || — || align=right | 3.5 km || 
|}

305301–305400 

|-bgcolor=#d6d6d6
| 305301 ||  || — || January 10, 2008 || Mount Lemmon || Mount Lemmon Survey || KOR || align=right | 1.2 km || 
|-id=302 bgcolor=#d6d6d6
| 305302 ||  || — || January 10, 2008 || Kitt Peak || Spacewatch || EOS || align=right | 2.6 km || 
|-id=303 bgcolor=#E9E9E9
| 305303 ||  || — || January 12, 2008 || Kanab || E. E. Sheridan || GEF || align=right | 1.3 km || 
|-id=304 bgcolor=#d6d6d6
| 305304 ||  || — || January 10, 2008 || Kitt Peak || Spacewatch || — || align=right | 3.7 km || 
|-id=305 bgcolor=#d6d6d6
| 305305 ||  || — || January 10, 2008 || Kitt Peak || Spacewatch || — || align=right | 3.4 km || 
|-id=306 bgcolor=#d6d6d6
| 305306 ||  || — || January 10, 2008 || Kitt Peak || Spacewatch || — || align=right | 2.6 km || 
|-id=307 bgcolor=#d6d6d6
| 305307 ||  || — || January 10, 2008 || Kitt Peak || Spacewatch || — || align=right | 2.7 km || 
|-id=308 bgcolor=#E9E9E9
| 305308 ||  || — || January 10, 2008 || Mount Lemmon || Mount Lemmon Survey || — || align=right | 2.6 km || 
|-id=309 bgcolor=#d6d6d6
| 305309 ||  || — || January 10, 2008 || Mount Lemmon || Mount Lemmon Survey || — || align=right | 2.6 km || 
|-id=310 bgcolor=#d6d6d6
| 305310 ||  || — || January 10, 2008 || Mount Lemmon || Mount Lemmon Survey || LIX || align=right | 5.0 km || 
|-id=311 bgcolor=#E9E9E9
| 305311 ||  || — || January 10, 2008 || Catalina || CSS || — || align=right | 1.2 km || 
|-id=312 bgcolor=#d6d6d6
| 305312 ||  || — || January 10, 2008 || Kitt Peak || Spacewatch || ALA || align=right | 4.7 km || 
|-id=313 bgcolor=#d6d6d6
| 305313 ||  || — || January 10, 2008 || Kitt Peak || Spacewatch || — || align=right | 3.4 km || 
|-id=314 bgcolor=#E9E9E9
| 305314 ||  || — || January 10, 2008 || Lulin || LUSS || — || align=right | 2.7 km || 
|-id=315 bgcolor=#E9E9E9
| 305315 ||  || — || January 10, 2008 || Lulin || LUSS || — || align=right | 1.3 km || 
|-id=316 bgcolor=#d6d6d6
| 305316 ||  || — || January 11, 2008 || Kitt Peak || Spacewatch || CHA || align=right | 2.5 km || 
|-id=317 bgcolor=#d6d6d6
| 305317 ||  || — || January 11, 2008 || Kitt Peak || Spacewatch || — || align=right | 3.2 km || 
|-id=318 bgcolor=#d6d6d6
| 305318 ||  || — || January 11, 2008 || Kitt Peak || Spacewatch || — || align=right | 4.0 km || 
|-id=319 bgcolor=#d6d6d6
| 305319 ||  || — || January 11, 2008 || Mount Lemmon || Mount Lemmon Survey || — || align=right | 3.2 km || 
|-id=320 bgcolor=#E9E9E9
| 305320 ||  || — || January 11, 2008 || Kitt Peak || Spacewatch || AGN || align=right | 1.5 km || 
|-id=321 bgcolor=#E9E9E9
| 305321 ||  || — || January 11, 2008 || Kitt Peak || Spacewatch || AGN || align=right | 1.7 km || 
|-id=322 bgcolor=#d6d6d6
| 305322 ||  || — || January 11, 2008 || Catalina || CSS || — || align=right | 3.2 km || 
|-id=323 bgcolor=#d6d6d6
| 305323 ||  || — || January 12, 2008 || Kitt Peak || Spacewatch || CHA || align=right | 2.5 km || 
|-id=324 bgcolor=#E9E9E9
| 305324 ||  || — || January 13, 2008 || Mount Lemmon || Mount Lemmon Survey || PAD || align=right | 1.9 km || 
|-id=325 bgcolor=#E9E9E9
| 305325 ||  || — || September 25, 2006 || Kitt Peak || Spacewatch || — || align=right | 2.6 km || 
|-id=326 bgcolor=#E9E9E9
| 305326 ||  || — || January 11, 2008 || Catalina || CSS || — || align=right | 2.4 km || 
|-id=327 bgcolor=#E9E9E9
| 305327 ||  || — || January 13, 2008 || Kitt Peak || Spacewatch || — || align=right | 2.4 km || 
|-id=328 bgcolor=#E9E9E9
| 305328 ||  || — || January 14, 2008 || Kitt Peak || Spacewatch || NEM || align=right | 2.5 km || 
|-id=329 bgcolor=#E9E9E9
| 305329 ||  || — || January 14, 2008 || Kitt Peak || Spacewatch || — || align=right | 2.5 km || 
|-id=330 bgcolor=#d6d6d6
| 305330 ||  || — || October 19, 2006 || Catalina || CSS || EOS || align=right | 2.1 km || 
|-id=331 bgcolor=#E9E9E9
| 305331 ||  || — || January 14, 2008 || Kitt Peak || Spacewatch || HOF || align=right | 3.1 km || 
|-id=332 bgcolor=#d6d6d6
| 305332 ||  || — || January 14, 2008 || Kitt Peak || Spacewatch || EOS || align=right | 2.2 km || 
|-id=333 bgcolor=#d6d6d6
| 305333 ||  || — || January 15, 2008 || Mount Lemmon || Mount Lemmon Survey || — || align=right | 3.4 km || 
|-id=334 bgcolor=#E9E9E9
| 305334 ||  || — || January 15, 2008 || Mount Lemmon || Mount Lemmon Survey || — || align=right | 1.3 km || 
|-id=335 bgcolor=#d6d6d6
| 305335 ||  || — || January 15, 2008 || Kitt Peak || Spacewatch || — || align=right | 3.7 km || 
|-id=336 bgcolor=#d6d6d6
| 305336 ||  || — || January 15, 2008 || Kitt Peak || Spacewatch || — || align=right | 3.8 km || 
|-id=337 bgcolor=#E9E9E9
| 305337 ||  || — || January 15, 2008 || Kitt Peak || Spacewatch || — || align=right | 2.6 km || 
|-id=338 bgcolor=#d6d6d6
| 305338 ||  || — || January 15, 2008 || Kitt Peak || Spacewatch || — || align=right | 3.9 km || 
|-id=339 bgcolor=#d6d6d6
| 305339 ||  || — || January 15, 2008 || Kitt Peak || Spacewatch || — || align=right | 3.4 km || 
|-id=340 bgcolor=#d6d6d6
| 305340 ||  || — || January 15, 2008 || Mount Lemmon || Mount Lemmon Survey || — || align=right | 2.9 km || 
|-id=341 bgcolor=#d6d6d6
| 305341 ||  || — || January 11, 2008 || Kitt Peak || Spacewatch || — || align=right | 3.7 km || 
|-id=342 bgcolor=#d6d6d6
| 305342 ||  || — || January 11, 2008 || Mount Lemmon || Mount Lemmon Survey || — || align=right | 3.7 km || 
|-id=343 bgcolor=#d6d6d6
| 305343 ||  || — || January 11, 2008 || Catalina || CSS || EUP || align=right | 4.9 km || 
|-id=344 bgcolor=#d6d6d6
| 305344 ||  || — || January 6, 2008 || Mauna Kea || P. A. Wiegert || — || align=right | 3.0 km || 
|-id=345 bgcolor=#d6d6d6
| 305345 ||  || — || January 10, 2008 || Mount Lemmon || Mount Lemmon Survey || KOR || align=right | 2.0 km || 
|-id=346 bgcolor=#d6d6d6
| 305346 ||  || — || January 5, 2008 || Bisei SG Center || BATTeRS || — || align=right | 3.6 km || 
|-id=347 bgcolor=#d6d6d6
| 305347 ||  || — || January 11, 2008 || Socorro || LINEAR || EOS || align=right | 2.4 km || 
|-id=348 bgcolor=#E9E9E9
| 305348 ||  || — || January 12, 2008 || Catalina || CSS || GEF || align=right | 1.7 km || 
|-id=349 bgcolor=#E9E9E9
| 305349 ||  || — || January 16, 2008 || Kitt Peak || Spacewatch || — || align=right | 2.7 km || 
|-id=350 bgcolor=#d6d6d6
| 305350 ||  || — || January 16, 2008 || Mount Lemmon || Mount Lemmon Survey || — || align=right | 4.7 km || 
|-id=351 bgcolor=#E9E9E9
| 305351 ||  || — || January 18, 2008 || Kitt Peak || Spacewatch || — || align=right | 4.0 km || 
|-id=352 bgcolor=#d6d6d6
| 305352 ||  || — || January 18, 2008 || Kitt Peak || Spacewatch || THM || align=right | 2.4 km || 
|-id=353 bgcolor=#d6d6d6
| 305353 ||  || — || January 19, 2008 || Mount Lemmon || Mount Lemmon Survey || — || align=right | 3.1 km || 
|-id=354 bgcolor=#E9E9E9
| 305354 ||  || — || January 20, 2008 || Mount Lemmon || Mount Lemmon Survey || GEF || align=right | 4.2 km || 
|-id=355 bgcolor=#E9E9E9
| 305355 ||  || — || January 29, 2008 || La Sagra || OAM Obs. || AGN || align=right | 1.6 km || 
|-id=356 bgcolor=#d6d6d6
| 305356 ||  || — || January 31, 2008 || Mount Lemmon || Mount Lemmon Survey || — || align=right | 3.5 km || 
|-id=357 bgcolor=#d6d6d6
| 305357 ||  || — || January 30, 2008 || Mount Lemmon || Mount Lemmon Survey || — || align=right | 3.9 km || 
|-id=358 bgcolor=#E9E9E9
| 305358 ||  || — || January 30, 2008 || Catalina || CSS || — || align=right | 2.3 km || 
|-id=359 bgcolor=#d6d6d6
| 305359 ||  || — || January 30, 2008 || Kitt Peak || Spacewatch || — || align=right | 3.3 km || 
|-id=360 bgcolor=#d6d6d6
| 305360 ||  || — || January 30, 2008 || Kitt Peak || Spacewatch || — || align=right | 2.9 km || 
|-id=361 bgcolor=#d6d6d6
| 305361 ||  || — || January 30, 2008 || Mount Lemmon || Mount Lemmon Survey || — || align=right | 2.4 km || 
|-id=362 bgcolor=#d6d6d6
| 305362 ||  || — || January 30, 2008 || Mount Lemmon || Mount Lemmon Survey || — || align=right | 2.6 km || 
|-id=363 bgcolor=#d6d6d6
| 305363 ||  || — || January 31, 2008 || Socorro || LINEAR || — || align=right | 3.2 km || 
|-id=364 bgcolor=#E9E9E9
| 305364 ||  || — || January 30, 2008 || Mount Lemmon || Mount Lemmon Survey || — || align=right | 3.1 km || 
|-id=365 bgcolor=#d6d6d6
| 305365 ||  || — || January 31, 2008 || Mount Lemmon || Mount Lemmon Survey || — || align=right | 2.9 km || 
|-id=366 bgcolor=#d6d6d6
| 305366 ||  || — || January 31, 2008 || Mount Lemmon || Mount Lemmon Survey || — || align=right | 4.5 km || 
|-id=367 bgcolor=#d6d6d6
| 305367 ||  || — || January 20, 2008 || Mount Lemmon || Mount Lemmon Survey || — || align=right | 4.3 km || 
|-id=368 bgcolor=#E9E9E9
| 305368 ||  || — || January 31, 2008 || Socorro || LINEAR || — || align=right | 2.5 km || 
|-id=369 bgcolor=#d6d6d6
| 305369 || 2008 CY || — || February 2, 2008 || Gaisberg || R. Gierlinger || — || align=right | 4.0 km || 
|-id=370 bgcolor=#d6d6d6
| 305370 ||  || — || February 2, 2008 || Kitt Peak || Spacewatch || EOS || align=right | 2.4 km || 
|-id=371 bgcolor=#d6d6d6
| 305371 ||  || — || February 2, 2008 || Kitt Peak || Spacewatch || — || align=right | 6.0 km || 
|-id=372 bgcolor=#E9E9E9
| 305372 ||  || — || February 3, 2008 || Catalina || CSS || — || align=right | 2.1 km || 
|-id=373 bgcolor=#d6d6d6
| 305373 ||  || — || February 3, 2008 || Kitt Peak || Spacewatch || — || align=right | 3.5 km || 
|-id=374 bgcolor=#d6d6d6
| 305374 ||  || — || February 3, 2008 || Kitt Peak || Spacewatch || — || align=right | 3.2 km || 
|-id=375 bgcolor=#E9E9E9
| 305375 ||  || — || February 3, 2008 || Kitt Peak || Spacewatch || DOR || align=right | 2.7 km || 
|-id=376 bgcolor=#d6d6d6
| 305376 ||  || — || February 3, 2008 || Kitt Peak || Spacewatch || CHA || align=right | 2.4 km || 
|-id=377 bgcolor=#d6d6d6
| 305377 ||  || — || February 3, 2008 || Kitt Peak || Spacewatch || HYG || align=right | 3.6 km || 
|-id=378 bgcolor=#d6d6d6
| 305378 ||  || — || February 3, 2008 || Kitt Peak || Spacewatch || HYG || align=right | 2.7 km || 
|-id=379 bgcolor=#d6d6d6
| 305379 ||  || — || February 3, 2008 || Kitt Peak || Spacewatch || — || align=right | 3.9 km || 
|-id=380 bgcolor=#d6d6d6
| 305380 ||  || — || February 1, 2008 || Kitt Peak || Spacewatch || — || align=right | 3.2 km || 
|-id=381 bgcolor=#d6d6d6
| 305381 ||  || — || February 2, 2008 || Kitt Peak || Spacewatch || ARM || align=right | 4.0 km || 
|-id=382 bgcolor=#d6d6d6
| 305382 ||  || — || February 2, 2008 || Kitt Peak || Spacewatch || — || align=right | 4.1 km || 
|-id=383 bgcolor=#d6d6d6
| 305383 ||  || — || February 2, 2008 || Mount Lemmon || Mount Lemmon Survey || EOS || align=right | 2.7 km || 
|-id=384 bgcolor=#d6d6d6
| 305384 ||  || — || September 18, 1995 || Kitt Peak || Spacewatch || — || align=right | 2.3 km || 
|-id=385 bgcolor=#d6d6d6
| 305385 ||  || — || February 2, 2008 || Mount Lemmon || Mount Lemmon Survey || 615 || align=right | 1.6 km || 
|-id=386 bgcolor=#d6d6d6
| 305386 ||  || — || February 2, 2008 || Mount Lemmon || Mount Lemmon Survey || — || align=right | 2.7 km || 
|-id=387 bgcolor=#d6d6d6
| 305387 ||  || — || February 2, 2008 || Kitt Peak || Spacewatch || — || align=right | 2.8 km || 
|-id=388 bgcolor=#d6d6d6
| 305388 ||  || — || February 2, 2008 || Kitt Peak || Spacewatch || HYG || align=right | 3.5 km || 
|-id=389 bgcolor=#d6d6d6
| 305389 ||  || — || February 6, 2008 || Catalina || CSS || EOS || align=right | 2.6 km || 
|-id=390 bgcolor=#d6d6d6
| 305390 ||  || — || February 7, 2008 || Catalina || CSS || — || align=right | 3.6 km || 
|-id=391 bgcolor=#d6d6d6
| 305391 ||  || — || February 7, 2008 || Mount Lemmon || Mount Lemmon Survey || — || align=right | 2.8 km || 
|-id=392 bgcolor=#E9E9E9
| 305392 ||  || — || February 7, 2008 || Mount Lemmon || Mount Lemmon Survey || — || align=right | 2.4 km || 
|-id=393 bgcolor=#d6d6d6
| 305393 ||  || — || February 7, 2008 || Kitt Peak || Spacewatch || — || align=right | 4.2 km || 
|-id=394 bgcolor=#d6d6d6
| 305394 ||  || — || February 8, 2008 || Mount Lemmon || Mount Lemmon Survey || — || align=right | 2.8 km || 
|-id=395 bgcolor=#d6d6d6
| 305395 ||  || — || February 8, 2008 || Mount Lemmon || Mount Lemmon Survey || — || align=right | 3.2 km || 
|-id=396 bgcolor=#d6d6d6
| 305396 ||  || — || February 8, 2008 || Mount Lemmon || Mount Lemmon Survey || HYG || align=right | 2.9 km || 
|-id=397 bgcolor=#E9E9E9
| 305397 ||  || — || February 9, 2008 || Junk Bond || D. Healy || MRX || align=right | 1.2 km || 
|-id=398 bgcolor=#d6d6d6
| 305398 ||  || — || February 6, 2008 || Catalina || CSS || — || align=right | 4.5 km || 
|-id=399 bgcolor=#d6d6d6
| 305399 ||  || — || February 6, 2008 || Catalina || CSS || EOS || align=right | 2.3 km || 
|-id=400 bgcolor=#d6d6d6
| 305400 ||  || — || February 6, 2008 || Catalina || CSS || — || align=right | 3.9 km || 
|}

305401–305500 

|-bgcolor=#d6d6d6
| 305401 ||  || — || February 7, 2008 || Kitt Peak || Spacewatch || ELF || align=right | 3.7 km || 
|-id=402 bgcolor=#d6d6d6
| 305402 ||  || — || February 7, 2008 || Mount Lemmon || Mount Lemmon Survey || CHA || align=right | 2.3 km || 
|-id=403 bgcolor=#d6d6d6
| 305403 ||  || — || February 7, 2008 || Mount Lemmon || Mount Lemmon Survey || — || align=right | 3.1 km || 
|-id=404 bgcolor=#d6d6d6
| 305404 ||  || — || February 7, 2008 || Kitt Peak || Spacewatch || — || align=right | 3.4 km || 
|-id=405 bgcolor=#d6d6d6
| 305405 ||  || — || February 7, 2008 || Mount Lemmon || Mount Lemmon Survey || — || align=right | 2.9 km || 
|-id=406 bgcolor=#d6d6d6
| 305406 ||  || — || February 8, 2008 || Kitt Peak || Spacewatch || — || align=right | 3.9 km || 
|-id=407 bgcolor=#d6d6d6
| 305407 ||  || — || February 8, 2008 || Mount Lemmon || Mount Lemmon Survey || — || align=right | 3.5 km || 
|-id=408 bgcolor=#d6d6d6
| 305408 ||  || — || February 8, 2008 || Kitt Peak || Spacewatch || — || align=right | 3.7 km || 
|-id=409 bgcolor=#d6d6d6
| 305409 ||  || — || February 8, 2008 || Siding Spring || SSS || — || align=right | 4.9 km || 
|-id=410 bgcolor=#d6d6d6
| 305410 ||  || — || February 9, 2008 || Kitt Peak || Spacewatch || — || align=right | 3.2 km || 
|-id=411 bgcolor=#d6d6d6
| 305411 ||  || — || February 9, 2008 || Mount Lemmon || Mount Lemmon Survey || — || align=right | 4.5 km || 
|-id=412 bgcolor=#d6d6d6
| 305412 ||  || — || February 9, 2008 || Mount Lemmon || Mount Lemmon Survey || EOS || align=right | 2.1 km || 
|-id=413 bgcolor=#d6d6d6
| 305413 ||  || — || October 20, 2006 || Mount Lemmon || Mount Lemmon Survey || ANF || align=right | 1.7 km || 
|-id=414 bgcolor=#d6d6d6
| 305414 ||  || — || February 9, 2008 || Catalina || CSS || — || align=right | 4.1 km || 
|-id=415 bgcolor=#d6d6d6
| 305415 ||  || — || February 10, 2008 || Kitt Peak || Spacewatch || HYG || align=right | 3.5 km || 
|-id=416 bgcolor=#d6d6d6
| 305416 ||  || — || February 11, 2008 || Dauban || F. Kugel || — || align=right | 3.5 km || 
|-id=417 bgcolor=#E9E9E9
| 305417 ||  || — || February 7, 2008 || Kitt Peak || Spacewatch || — || align=right | 2.3 km || 
|-id=418 bgcolor=#d6d6d6
| 305418 ||  || — || February 8, 2008 || Kitt Peak || Spacewatch || — || align=right | 3.4 km || 
|-id=419 bgcolor=#d6d6d6
| 305419 ||  || — || February 8, 2008 || Kitt Peak || Spacewatch || EOS || align=right | 2.4 km || 
|-id=420 bgcolor=#d6d6d6
| 305420 ||  || — || February 8, 2008 || Kitt Peak || Spacewatch || HYG || align=right | 3.1 km || 
|-id=421 bgcolor=#d6d6d6
| 305421 ||  || — || February 8, 2008 || Kitt Peak || Spacewatch || — || align=right | 3.2 km || 
|-id=422 bgcolor=#d6d6d6
| 305422 ||  || — || February 8, 2008 || Mount Lemmon || Mount Lemmon Survey || HYG || align=right | 3.3 km || 
|-id=423 bgcolor=#d6d6d6
| 305423 ||  || — || February 8, 2008 || Mount Lemmon || Mount Lemmon Survey || HYG || align=right | 3.4 km || 
|-id=424 bgcolor=#d6d6d6
| 305424 ||  || — || February 8, 2008 || Kitt Peak || Spacewatch || — || align=right | 3.1 km || 
|-id=425 bgcolor=#d6d6d6
| 305425 ||  || — || February 8, 2008 || Kitt Peak || Spacewatch || — || align=right | 2.8 km || 
|-id=426 bgcolor=#d6d6d6
| 305426 ||  || — || February 8, 2008 || Kitt Peak || Spacewatch || — || align=right | 3.2 km || 
|-id=427 bgcolor=#d6d6d6
| 305427 ||  || — || February 9, 2008 || Kitt Peak || Spacewatch || — || align=right | 3.6 km || 
|-id=428 bgcolor=#d6d6d6
| 305428 ||  || — || February 9, 2008 || Kitt Peak || Spacewatch || — || align=right | 2.4 km || 
|-id=429 bgcolor=#d6d6d6
| 305429 ||  || — || February 9, 2008 || Kitt Peak || Spacewatch || — || align=right | 4.1 km || 
|-id=430 bgcolor=#d6d6d6
| 305430 ||  || — || February 9, 2008 || Kitt Peak || Spacewatch || — || align=right | 3.4 km || 
|-id=431 bgcolor=#d6d6d6
| 305431 ||  || — || February 9, 2008 || Kitt Peak || Spacewatch || EUP || align=right | 5.2 km || 
|-id=432 bgcolor=#d6d6d6
| 305432 ||  || — || February 10, 2008 || Mount Lemmon || Mount Lemmon Survey || — || align=right | 2.6 km || 
|-id=433 bgcolor=#d6d6d6
| 305433 ||  || — || February 10, 2008 || Catalina || CSS || — || align=right | 3.4 km || 
|-id=434 bgcolor=#d6d6d6
| 305434 ||  || — || February 13, 2008 || Kitt Peak || Spacewatch || CRO || align=right | 2.6 km || 
|-id=435 bgcolor=#d6d6d6
| 305435 ||  || — || February 13, 2008 || Mount Lemmon || Mount Lemmon Survey || VER || align=right | 3.4 km || 
|-id=436 bgcolor=#d6d6d6
| 305436 ||  || — || February 6, 2008 || Socorro || LINEAR || — || align=right | 3.3 km || 
|-id=437 bgcolor=#E9E9E9
| 305437 ||  || — || February 6, 2008 || Catalina || CSS || — || align=right | 2.1 km || 
|-id=438 bgcolor=#d6d6d6
| 305438 ||  || — || July 31, 2005 || Palomar || NEAT || — || align=right | 4.6 km || 
|-id=439 bgcolor=#E9E9E9
| 305439 ||  || — || February 2, 2008 || Catalina || CSS || — || align=right | 2.6 km || 
|-id=440 bgcolor=#d6d6d6
| 305440 ||  || — || February 3, 2008 || Catalina || CSS || — || align=right | 3.9 km || 
|-id=441 bgcolor=#d6d6d6
| 305441 ||  || — || February 2, 2008 || Mount Lemmon || Mount Lemmon Survey || EUP || align=right | 6.3 km || 
|-id=442 bgcolor=#d6d6d6
| 305442 ||  || — || February 3, 2008 || Kitt Peak || Spacewatch || — || align=right | 2.9 km || 
|-id=443 bgcolor=#d6d6d6
| 305443 ||  || — || February 7, 2008 || Kitt Peak || Spacewatch || KOR || align=right | 1.5 km || 
|-id=444 bgcolor=#d6d6d6
| 305444 ||  || — || February 10, 2008 || Mount Lemmon || Mount Lemmon Survey || THM || align=right | 2.4 km || 
|-id=445 bgcolor=#d6d6d6
| 305445 ||  || — || February 1, 2008 || Kitt Peak || Spacewatch || — || align=right | 2.7 km || 
|-id=446 bgcolor=#d6d6d6
| 305446 ||  || — || February 2, 2008 || Kitt Peak || Spacewatch || THM || align=right | 3.1 km || 
|-id=447 bgcolor=#d6d6d6
| 305447 ||  || — || February 8, 2008 || Kitt Peak || Spacewatch || — || align=right | 3.1 km || 
|-id=448 bgcolor=#d6d6d6
| 305448 ||  || — || February 2, 2008 || Kitt Peak || Spacewatch || EMA || align=right | 3.3 km || 
|-id=449 bgcolor=#d6d6d6
| 305449 ||  || — || October 27, 2006 || Kitt Peak || Spacewatch || — || align=right | 3.5 km || 
|-id=450 bgcolor=#d6d6d6
| 305450 ||  || — || February 3, 2008 || Kitt Peak || Spacewatch || — || align=right | 3.4 km || 
|-id=451 bgcolor=#d6d6d6
| 305451 ||  || — || February 9, 2008 || Catalina || CSS || — || align=right | 3.7 km || 
|-id=452 bgcolor=#d6d6d6
| 305452 ||  || — || February 11, 2008 || Catalina || CSS || TIR || align=right | 4.1 km || 
|-id=453 bgcolor=#d6d6d6
| 305453 ||  || — || February 24, 2008 || Kitt Peak || Spacewatch || — || align=right | 3.7 km || 
|-id=454 bgcolor=#d6d6d6
| 305454 ||  || — || February 27, 2008 || Wildberg || R. Apitzsch || fast? || align=right | 2.9 km || 
|-id=455 bgcolor=#d6d6d6
| 305455 ||  || — || February 24, 2008 || Mount Lemmon || Mount Lemmon Survey || EOS || align=right | 2.0 km || 
|-id=456 bgcolor=#d6d6d6
| 305456 ||  || — || February 25, 2008 || Mount Lemmon || Mount Lemmon Survey || — || align=right | 2.6 km || 
|-id=457 bgcolor=#d6d6d6
| 305457 ||  || — || February 26, 2008 || Kitt Peak || Spacewatch || MRC || align=right | 3.1 km || 
|-id=458 bgcolor=#d6d6d6
| 305458 ||  || — || February 26, 2008 || Kitt Peak || Spacewatch || K-2 || align=right | 1.5 km || 
|-id=459 bgcolor=#d6d6d6
| 305459 ||  || — || February 27, 2008 || Kitt Peak || Spacewatch || — || align=right | 3.3 km || 
|-id=460 bgcolor=#d6d6d6
| 305460 ||  || — || February 27, 2008 || Kitt Peak || Spacewatch || — || align=right | 3.3 km || 
|-id=461 bgcolor=#d6d6d6
| 305461 ||  || — || February 24, 2008 || Kitt Peak || Spacewatch || — || align=right | 3.6 km || 
|-id=462 bgcolor=#d6d6d6
| 305462 ||  || — || February 28, 2008 || Mount Lemmon || Mount Lemmon Survey || — || align=right | 4.1 km || 
|-id=463 bgcolor=#E9E9E9
| 305463 ||  || — || February 29, 2008 || Purple Mountain || PMO NEO || — || align=right | 3.5 km || 
|-id=464 bgcolor=#d6d6d6
| 305464 ||  || — || February 29, 2008 || Purple Mountain || PMO NEO || — || align=right | 3.7 km || 
|-id=465 bgcolor=#d6d6d6
| 305465 ||  || — || February 26, 2008 || Kitt Peak || Spacewatch || — || align=right | 3.5 km || 
|-id=466 bgcolor=#d6d6d6
| 305466 ||  || — || February 27, 2008 || Catalina || CSS || EMA || align=right | 3.7 km || 
|-id=467 bgcolor=#d6d6d6
| 305467 ||  || — || February 27, 2008 || Mount Lemmon || Mount Lemmon Survey || — || align=right | 4.1 km || 
|-id=468 bgcolor=#d6d6d6
| 305468 ||  || — || February 27, 2008 || Catalina || CSS || HYG || align=right | 3.9 km || 
|-id=469 bgcolor=#d6d6d6
| 305469 ||  || — || February 27, 2008 || Mount Lemmon || Mount Lemmon Survey || — || align=right | 3.3 km || 
|-id=470 bgcolor=#d6d6d6
| 305470 ||  || — || February 27, 2008 || Catalina || CSS || LIX || align=right | 5.4 km || 
|-id=471 bgcolor=#d6d6d6
| 305471 ||  || — || February 28, 2008 || Mount Lemmon || Mount Lemmon Survey || HYG || align=right | 2.8 km || 
|-id=472 bgcolor=#d6d6d6
| 305472 ||  || — || February 28, 2008 || Kitt Peak || Spacewatch || — || align=right | 4.1 km || 
|-id=473 bgcolor=#d6d6d6
| 305473 ||  || — || February 29, 2008 || Catalina || CSS || BRA || align=right | 2.2 km || 
|-id=474 bgcolor=#d6d6d6
| 305474 ||  || — || February 29, 2008 || Catalina || CSS || — || align=right | 3.9 km || 
|-id=475 bgcolor=#d6d6d6
| 305475 ||  || — || February 28, 2008 || Catalina || CSS || — || align=right | 3.6 km || 
|-id=476 bgcolor=#d6d6d6
| 305476 ||  || — || February 27, 2008 || Catalina || CSS || — || align=right | 5.1 km || 
|-id=477 bgcolor=#d6d6d6
| 305477 ||  || — || February 27, 2008 || Mount Lemmon || Mount Lemmon Survey || HYG || align=right | 3.7 km || 
|-id=478 bgcolor=#d6d6d6
| 305478 ||  || — || February 28, 2008 || Kitt Peak || Spacewatch || — || align=right | 4.5 km || 
|-id=479 bgcolor=#d6d6d6
| 305479 ||  || — || February 29, 2008 || Kitt Peak || Spacewatch || — || align=right | 3.8 km || 
|-id=480 bgcolor=#d6d6d6
| 305480 ||  || — || February 24, 2008 || Kitt Peak || Spacewatch || — || align=right | 2.7 km || 
|-id=481 bgcolor=#d6d6d6
| 305481 ||  || — || February 26, 2008 || Mount Lemmon || Mount Lemmon Survey || — || align=right | 3.0 km || 
|-id=482 bgcolor=#d6d6d6
| 305482 ||  || — || February 26, 2008 || Mount Lemmon || Mount Lemmon Survey || EOS || align=right | 2.3 km || 
|-id=483 bgcolor=#d6d6d6
| 305483 ||  || — || February 28, 2008 || Mount Lemmon || Mount Lemmon Survey || — || align=right | 2.3 km || 
|-id=484 bgcolor=#d6d6d6
| 305484 ||  || — || February 18, 2008 || Mount Lemmon || Mount Lemmon Survey || EMA || align=right | 3.9 km || 
|-id=485 bgcolor=#d6d6d6
| 305485 ||  || — || February 18, 2008 || Mount Lemmon || Mount Lemmon Survey || — || align=right | 3.1 km || 
|-id=486 bgcolor=#d6d6d6
| 305486 ||  || — || February 28, 2008 || Kitt Peak || Spacewatch || — || align=right | 2.7 km || 
|-id=487 bgcolor=#d6d6d6
| 305487 ||  || — || March 1, 2008 || Kitt Peak || Spacewatch || — || align=right | 4.8 km || 
|-id=488 bgcolor=#d6d6d6
| 305488 ||  || — || March 1, 2008 || Anderson Mesa || LONEOS || — || align=right | 4.7 km || 
|-id=489 bgcolor=#d6d6d6
| 305489 ||  || — || March 1, 2008 || Kitt Peak || Spacewatch || EOS || align=right | 2.6 km || 
|-id=490 bgcolor=#d6d6d6
| 305490 ||  || — || March 1, 2008 || Kitt Peak || Spacewatch || — || align=right | 3.1 km || 
|-id=491 bgcolor=#d6d6d6
| 305491 ||  || — || March 3, 2008 || Mount Lemmon || Mount Lemmon Survey || — || align=right | 3.3 km || 
|-id=492 bgcolor=#d6d6d6
| 305492 ||  || — || March 3, 2008 || Kitt Peak || Spacewatch || — || align=right | 2.6 km || 
|-id=493 bgcolor=#d6d6d6
| 305493 ||  || — || March 4, 2008 || Kitt Peak || Spacewatch || — || align=right | 3.5 km || 
|-id=494 bgcolor=#d6d6d6
| 305494 ||  || — || March 5, 2008 || Mount Lemmon || Mount Lemmon Survey || HYG || align=right | 3.1 km || 
|-id=495 bgcolor=#d6d6d6
| 305495 ||  || — || March 8, 2008 || Kitt Peak || Spacewatch || CHA || align=right | 2.3 km || 
|-id=496 bgcolor=#d6d6d6
| 305496 ||  || — || March 7, 2008 || Catalina || CSS || HYG || align=right | 3.3 km || 
|-id=497 bgcolor=#d6d6d6
| 305497 ||  || — || March 7, 2008 || Kitt Peak || Spacewatch || — || align=right | 3.3 km || 
|-id=498 bgcolor=#d6d6d6
| 305498 ||  || — || March 7, 2008 || Kitt Peak || Spacewatch || — || align=right | 3.5 km || 
|-id=499 bgcolor=#d6d6d6
| 305499 ||  || — || March 8, 2008 || Catalina || CSS || — || align=right | 4.1 km || 
|-id=500 bgcolor=#d6d6d6
| 305500 ||  || — || March 7, 2008 || Mount Lemmon || Mount Lemmon Survey || EOS || align=right | 2.2 km || 
|}

305501–305600 

|-bgcolor=#d6d6d6
| 305501 ||  || — || March 3, 2008 || Catalina || CSS || ALA || align=right | 4.2 km || 
|-id=502 bgcolor=#d6d6d6
| 305502 ||  || — || March 8, 2008 || Goodricke-Pigott || R. A. Tucker || — || align=right | 6.4 km || 
|-id=503 bgcolor=#d6d6d6
| 305503 ||  || — || March 7, 2008 || Mount Lemmon || Mount Lemmon Survey || — || align=right | 3.0 km || 
|-id=504 bgcolor=#d6d6d6
| 305504 ||  || — || March 7, 2008 || Mount Lemmon || Mount Lemmon Survey || — || align=right | 3.7 km || 
|-id=505 bgcolor=#d6d6d6
| 305505 ||  || — || March 8, 2008 || Mount Lemmon || Mount Lemmon Survey || — || align=right | 2.9 km || 
|-id=506 bgcolor=#d6d6d6
| 305506 ||  || — || March 8, 2008 || Kitt Peak || Spacewatch || — || align=right | 2.7 km || 
|-id=507 bgcolor=#d6d6d6
| 305507 ||  || — || March 8, 2008 || Kitt Peak || Spacewatch || — || align=right | 2.9 km || 
|-id=508 bgcolor=#d6d6d6
| 305508 ||  || — || March 11, 2008 || Mount Lemmon || Mount Lemmon Survey || — || align=right | 7.0 km || 
|-id=509 bgcolor=#d6d6d6
| 305509 ||  || — || March 10, 2008 || Catalina || CSS || EOS || align=right | 2.5 km || 
|-id=510 bgcolor=#d6d6d6
| 305510 ||  || — || March 2, 2008 || Kitt Peak || Spacewatch || — || align=right | 3.1 km || 
|-id=511 bgcolor=#d6d6d6
| 305511 ||  || — || March 7, 2008 || Catalina || CSS || — || align=right | 3.8 km || 
|-id=512 bgcolor=#d6d6d6
| 305512 ||  || — || March 11, 2008 || Kitt Peak || Spacewatch || 7:4 || align=right | 3.6 km || 
|-id=513 bgcolor=#d6d6d6
| 305513 ||  || — || March 8, 2008 || Kitt Peak || Spacewatch || — || align=right | 4.7 km || 
|-id=514 bgcolor=#d6d6d6
| 305514 ||  || — || March 7, 2008 || Mount Lemmon || Mount Lemmon Survey || — || align=right | 3.1 km || 
|-id=515 bgcolor=#d6d6d6
| 305515 ||  || — || March 25, 2008 || Kitt Peak || Spacewatch || — || align=right | 3.5 km || 
|-id=516 bgcolor=#d6d6d6
| 305516 ||  || — || November 18, 1995 || Kitt Peak || Spacewatch || — || align=right | 2.7 km || 
|-id=517 bgcolor=#d6d6d6
| 305517 ||  || — || March 26, 2008 || Kitt Peak || Spacewatch || — || align=right | 3.3 km || 
|-id=518 bgcolor=#d6d6d6
| 305518 ||  || — || March 26, 2008 || Mount Lemmon || Mount Lemmon Survey || — || align=right | 3.4 km || 
|-id=519 bgcolor=#d6d6d6
| 305519 ||  || — || March 27, 2008 || Kitt Peak || Spacewatch || — || align=right | 2.9 km || 
|-id=520 bgcolor=#d6d6d6
| 305520 ||  || — || March 27, 2008 || Mount Lemmon || Mount Lemmon Survey || — || align=right | 2.2 km || 
|-id=521 bgcolor=#d6d6d6
| 305521 ||  || — || March 27, 2008 || Mount Lemmon || Mount Lemmon Survey || THM || align=right | 2.8 km || 
|-id=522 bgcolor=#d6d6d6
| 305522 ||  || — || March 28, 2008 || Mount Lemmon || Mount Lemmon Survey || — || align=right | 3.5 km || 
|-id=523 bgcolor=#d6d6d6
| 305523 ||  || — || March 28, 2008 || Mount Lemmon || Mount Lemmon Survey || — || align=right | 4.8 km || 
|-id=524 bgcolor=#d6d6d6
| 305524 ||  || — || March 28, 2008 || Mount Lemmon || Mount Lemmon Survey || — || align=right | 3.0 km || 
|-id=525 bgcolor=#d6d6d6
| 305525 ||  || — || March 29, 2008 || Catalina || CSS || — || align=right | 3.5 km || 
|-id=526 bgcolor=#d6d6d6
| 305526 ||  || — || March 28, 2008 || Mount Lemmon || Mount Lemmon Survey || — || align=right | 2.9 km || 
|-id=527 bgcolor=#d6d6d6
| 305527 ||  || — || March 29, 2008 || Mount Lemmon || Mount Lemmon Survey || — || align=right | 3.5 km || 
|-id=528 bgcolor=#d6d6d6
| 305528 ||  || — || March 28, 2008 || Kitt Peak || Spacewatch || EUP || align=right | 4.2 km || 
|-id=529 bgcolor=#d6d6d6
| 305529 ||  || — || March 29, 2008 || Kitt Peak || Spacewatch || — || align=right | 3.9 km || 
|-id=530 bgcolor=#d6d6d6
| 305530 ||  || — || March 29, 2008 || Piszkéstető || K. Sárneczky || TRP || align=right | 2.2 km || 
|-id=531 bgcolor=#d6d6d6
| 305531 ||  || — || April 5, 2008 || Mount Lemmon || Mount Lemmon Survey || — || align=right | 2.6 km || 
|-id=532 bgcolor=#d6d6d6
| 305532 ||  || — || April 1, 2008 || Mount Lemmon || Mount Lemmon Survey || — || align=right | 3.5 km || 
|-id=533 bgcolor=#d6d6d6
| 305533 ||  || — || April 1, 2008 || Kitt Peak || Spacewatch || MEL || align=right | 4.0 km || 
|-id=534 bgcolor=#d6d6d6
| 305534 ||  || — || April 3, 2008 || Mount Lemmon || Mount Lemmon Survey || THM || align=right | 2.9 km || 
|-id=535 bgcolor=#d6d6d6
| 305535 ||  || — || April 5, 2008 || Mount Lemmon || Mount Lemmon Survey || THM || align=right | 2.4 km || 
|-id=536 bgcolor=#d6d6d6
| 305536 ||  || — || April 5, 2008 || Kitt Peak || Spacewatch || — || align=right | 4.3 km || 
|-id=537 bgcolor=#d6d6d6
| 305537 ||  || — || April 6, 2008 || Kitt Peak || Spacewatch || — || align=right | 2.7 km || 
|-id=538 bgcolor=#d6d6d6
| 305538 ||  || — || April 8, 2008 || Kitt Peak || Spacewatch || — || align=right | 5.8 km || 
|-id=539 bgcolor=#d6d6d6
| 305539 ||  || — || April 1, 2008 || Kitt Peak || Spacewatch || — || align=right | 3.1 km || 
|-id=540 bgcolor=#d6d6d6
| 305540 ||  || — || April 24, 2008 || Mount Lemmon || Mount Lemmon Survey || — || align=right | 3.4 km || 
|-id=541 bgcolor=#d6d6d6
| 305541 ||  || — || April 26, 2008 || Mount Lemmon || Mount Lemmon Survey || — || align=right | 3.0 km || 
|-id=542 bgcolor=#d6d6d6
| 305542 ||  || — || April 29, 2008 || Kitt Peak || Spacewatch || — || align=right | 3.1 km || 
|-id=543 bgcolor=#C2E0FF
| 305543 ||  || — || August 25, 2008 || Palomar || M. E. Schwamb, M. E. Brown, D. L. Rabinowitz || SDOcritical || align=right | 350 km || 
|-id=544 bgcolor=#C2FFFF
| 305544 ||  || — || June 26, 2007 || Kitt Peak || Spacewatch || L4 || align=right | 13 km || 
|-id=545 bgcolor=#fefefe
| 305545 ||  || — || September 23, 2008 || Kitt Peak || Spacewatch || — || align=right data-sort-value="0.86" | 860 m || 
|-id=546 bgcolor=#fefefe
| 305546 ||  || — || September 28, 2008 || Mount Lemmon || Mount Lemmon Survey || — || align=right data-sort-value="0.67" | 670 m || 
|-id=547 bgcolor=#fefefe
| 305547 ||  || — || September 21, 2008 || Catalina || CSS || — || align=right | 1.1 km || 
|-id=548 bgcolor=#fefefe
| 305548 ||  || — || October 1, 2008 || Kitt Peak || Spacewatch || — || align=right data-sort-value="0.81" | 810 m || 
|-id=549 bgcolor=#fefefe
| 305549 ||  || — || October 20, 2008 || Kitt Peak || Spacewatch || FLO || align=right data-sort-value="0.71" | 710 m || 
|-id=550 bgcolor=#fefefe
| 305550 ||  || — || October 21, 2008 || Kitt Peak || Spacewatch || — || align=right data-sort-value="0.89" | 890 m || 
|-id=551 bgcolor=#fefefe
| 305551 ||  || — || October 22, 2008 || Kitt Peak || Spacewatch || — || align=right data-sort-value="0.82" | 820 m || 
|-id=552 bgcolor=#fefefe
| 305552 ||  || — || October 22, 2008 || Kitt Peak || Spacewatch || FLO || align=right data-sort-value="0.68" | 680 m || 
|-id=553 bgcolor=#fefefe
| 305553 ||  || — || October 24, 2008 || Mount Lemmon || Mount Lemmon Survey || — || align=right data-sort-value="0.61" | 610 m || 
|-id=554 bgcolor=#fefefe
| 305554 ||  || — || October 24, 2008 || Kitt Peak || Spacewatch || FLO || align=right data-sort-value="0.77" | 770 m || 
|-id=555 bgcolor=#fefefe
| 305555 ||  || — || October 25, 2008 || Kitt Peak || Spacewatch || FLO || align=right data-sort-value="0.76" | 760 m || 
|-id=556 bgcolor=#fefefe
| 305556 ||  || — || October 28, 2008 || Kitt Peak || Spacewatch || — || align=right data-sort-value="0.72" | 720 m || 
|-id=557 bgcolor=#fefefe
| 305557 ||  || — || October 28, 2008 || Kitt Peak || Spacewatch || — || align=right | 1.4 km || 
|-id=558 bgcolor=#fefefe
| 305558 ||  || — || October 29, 2008 || Mount Lemmon || Mount Lemmon Survey || — || align=right data-sort-value="0.94" | 940 m || 
|-id=559 bgcolor=#fefefe
| 305559 ||  || — || October 23, 2008 || Kitt Peak || Spacewatch || FLO || align=right data-sort-value="0.79" | 790 m || 
|-id=560 bgcolor=#E9E9E9
| 305560 ||  || — || October 31, 2008 || Mount Lemmon || Mount Lemmon Survey || — || align=right | 2.1 km || 
|-id=561 bgcolor=#fefefe
| 305561 ||  || — || November 1, 2008 || Mount Lemmon || Mount Lemmon Survey || — || align=right | 1.1 km || 
|-id=562 bgcolor=#fefefe
| 305562 ||  || — || November 2, 2008 || Kitt Peak || Spacewatch || FLO || align=right data-sort-value="0.70" | 700 m || 
|-id=563 bgcolor=#fefefe
| 305563 ||  || — || November 6, 2008 || Kitt Peak || Spacewatch || — || align=right | 1.3 km || 
|-id=564 bgcolor=#fefefe
| 305564 ||  || — || November 1, 2008 || Mount Lemmon || Mount Lemmon Survey || — || align=right data-sort-value="0.80" | 800 m || 
|-id=565 bgcolor=#fefefe
| 305565 ||  || — || November 17, 2008 || Kitt Peak || Spacewatch || — || align=right data-sort-value="0.91" | 910 m || 
|-id=566 bgcolor=#fefefe
| 305566 ||  || — || November 8, 2008 || Kitt Peak || Spacewatch || — || align=right | 1.1 km || 
|-id=567 bgcolor=#fefefe
| 305567 ||  || — || November 20, 2008 || Mount Lemmon || Mount Lemmon Survey || — || align=right data-sort-value="0.72" | 720 m || 
|-id=568 bgcolor=#fefefe
| 305568 ||  || — || November 19, 2008 || Kitt Peak || Spacewatch || — || align=right data-sort-value="0.81" | 810 m || 
|-id=569 bgcolor=#fefefe
| 305569 ||  || — || November 21, 2008 || Mount Lemmon || Mount Lemmon Survey || NYS || align=right data-sort-value="0.54" | 540 m || 
|-id=570 bgcolor=#fefefe
| 305570 ||  || — || November 30, 2008 || Kitt Peak || Spacewatch || — || align=right data-sort-value="0.93" | 930 m || 
|-id=571 bgcolor=#fefefe
| 305571 ||  || — || November 24, 2008 || Mount Lemmon || Mount Lemmon Survey || NYS || align=right data-sort-value="0.82" | 820 m || 
|-id=572 bgcolor=#E9E9E9
| 305572 ||  || — || November 24, 2008 || Mount Lemmon || Mount Lemmon Survey || MRX || align=right | 1.5 km || 
|-id=573 bgcolor=#E9E9E9
| 305573 ||  || — || December 6, 2008 || Bisei SG Center || BATTeRS || BRU || align=right | 3.6 km || 
|-id=574 bgcolor=#fefefe
| 305574 ||  || — || December 1, 2008 || Kitt Peak || Spacewatch || FLO || align=right data-sort-value="0.94" | 940 m || 
|-id=575 bgcolor=#fefefe
| 305575 ||  || — || December 2, 2008 || Kitt Peak || Spacewatch || — || align=right data-sort-value="0.97" | 970 m || 
|-id=576 bgcolor=#fefefe
| 305576 ||  || — || December 4, 2008 || Catalina || CSS || PHO || align=right | 1.4 km || 
|-id=577 bgcolor=#E9E9E9
| 305577 ||  || — || December 22, 2008 || Piszkéstető || K. Sárneczky || — || align=right | 1.6 km || 
|-id=578 bgcolor=#fefefe
| 305578 ||  || — || December 21, 2008 || Kitt Peak || Spacewatch || — || align=right data-sort-value="0.83" | 830 m || 
|-id=579 bgcolor=#fefefe
| 305579 ||  || — || December 21, 2008 || Mount Lemmon || Mount Lemmon Survey || V || align=right data-sort-value="0.91" | 910 m || 
|-id=580 bgcolor=#E9E9E9
| 305580 ||  || — || December 21, 2008 || Mount Lemmon || Mount Lemmon Survey || DOR || align=right | 3.3 km || 
|-id=581 bgcolor=#fefefe
| 305581 ||  || — || December 29, 2008 || Kitt Peak || Spacewatch || — || align=right | 1.0 km || 
|-id=582 bgcolor=#fefefe
| 305582 ||  || — || January 25, 1998 || Modra || A. Galád || NYS || align=right data-sort-value="0.72" | 720 m || 
|-id=583 bgcolor=#fefefe
| 305583 ||  || — || December 29, 2008 || Mount Lemmon || Mount Lemmon Survey || — || align=right data-sort-value="0.89" | 890 m || 
|-id=584 bgcolor=#fefefe
| 305584 ||  || — || December 29, 2008 || Kitt Peak || Spacewatch || MAS || align=right data-sort-value="0.76" | 760 m || 
|-id=585 bgcolor=#fefefe
| 305585 ||  || — || December 29, 2008 || Mount Lemmon || Mount Lemmon Survey || NYS || align=right data-sort-value="0.81" | 810 m || 
|-id=586 bgcolor=#fefefe
| 305586 ||  || — || December 29, 2008 || Mount Lemmon || Mount Lemmon Survey || NYS || align=right data-sort-value="0.77" | 770 m || 
|-id=587 bgcolor=#fefefe
| 305587 ||  || — || December 30, 2008 || Mount Lemmon || Mount Lemmon Survey || NYS || align=right data-sort-value="0.66" | 660 m || 
|-id=588 bgcolor=#fefefe
| 305588 ||  || — || December 30, 2008 || Mount Lemmon || Mount Lemmon Survey || — || align=right data-sort-value="0.96" | 960 m || 
|-id=589 bgcolor=#E9E9E9
| 305589 ||  || — || December 30, 2008 || Mount Lemmon || Mount Lemmon Survey || JUN || align=right | 2.9 km || 
|-id=590 bgcolor=#fefefe
| 305590 ||  || — || December 29, 2008 || Kitt Peak || Spacewatch || — || align=right | 1.1 km || 
|-id=591 bgcolor=#fefefe
| 305591 ||  || — || December 29, 2008 || Kitt Peak || Spacewatch || — || align=right data-sort-value="0.94" | 940 m || 
|-id=592 bgcolor=#fefefe
| 305592 ||  || — || September 22, 2003 || Kitt Peak || Spacewatch || V || align=right data-sort-value="0.88" | 880 m || 
|-id=593 bgcolor=#fefefe
| 305593 ||  || — || December 29, 2008 || Kitt Peak || Spacewatch || — || align=right | 1.3 km || 
|-id=594 bgcolor=#fefefe
| 305594 ||  || — || December 29, 2008 || Kitt Peak || Spacewatch || — || align=right | 1.1 km || 
|-id=595 bgcolor=#fefefe
| 305595 ||  || — || December 29, 2008 || Kitt Peak || Spacewatch || — || align=right data-sort-value="0.98" | 980 m || 
|-id=596 bgcolor=#fefefe
| 305596 ||  || — || December 29, 2008 || Kitt Peak || Spacewatch || MAS || align=right data-sort-value="0.81" | 810 m || 
|-id=597 bgcolor=#fefefe
| 305597 ||  || — || December 29, 2008 || Kitt Peak || Spacewatch || — || align=right data-sort-value="0.68" | 680 m || 
|-id=598 bgcolor=#E9E9E9
| 305598 ||  || — || December 30, 2008 || Kitt Peak || Spacewatch || NEM || align=right | 2.8 km || 
|-id=599 bgcolor=#fefefe
| 305599 ||  || — || December 30, 2008 || Kitt Peak || Spacewatch || V || align=right data-sort-value="0.94" | 940 m || 
|-id=600 bgcolor=#fefefe
| 305600 ||  || — || December 30, 2008 || Kitt Peak || Spacewatch || V || align=right data-sort-value="0.82" | 820 m || 
|}

305601–305700 

|-bgcolor=#fefefe
| 305601 ||  || — || December 30, 2008 || Kitt Peak || Spacewatch || — || align=right data-sort-value="0.89" | 890 m || 
|-id=602 bgcolor=#fefefe
| 305602 ||  || — || December 30, 2008 || La Sagra || OAM Obs. || — || align=right data-sort-value="0.89" | 890 m || 
|-id=603 bgcolor=#fefefe
| 305603 ||  || — || December 30, 2008 || Kitt Peak || Spacewatch || MAS || align=right data-sort-value="0.90" | 900 m || 
|-id=604 bgcolor=#fefefe
| 305604 ||  || — || December 30, 2008 || Kitt Peak || Spacewatch || — || align=right data-sort-value="0.98" | 980 m || 
|-id=605 bgcolor=#fefefe
| 305605 ||  || — || December 30, 2008 || Mount Lemmon || Mount Lemmon Survey || — || align=right data-sort-value="0.81" | 810 m || 
|-id=606 bgcolor=#E9E9E9
| 305606 ||  || — || December 22, 2008 || Kitt Peak || Spacewatch || — || align=right | 1.4 km || 
|-id=607 bgcolor=#fefefe
| 305607 ||  || — || December 30, 2008 || Mount Lemmon || Mount Lemmon Survey || FLO || align=right data-sort-value="0.78" | 780 m || 
|-id=608 bgcolor=#fefefe
| 305608 ||  || — || December 29, 2008 || Kitt Peak || Spacewatch || FLO || align=right data-sort-value="0.57" | 570 m || 
|-id=609 bgcolor=#fefefe
| 305609 ||  || — || December 31, 2008 || Mount Lemmon || Mount Lemmon Survey || NYS || align=right data-sort-value="0.77" | 770 m || 
|-id=610 bgcolor=#E9E9E9
| 305610 ||  || — || December 31, 2008 || Mount Lemmon || Mount Lemmon Survey || — || align=right | 1.2 km || 
|-id=611 bgcolor=#fefefe
| 305611 ||  || — || December 22, 2008 || Mount Lemmon || Mount Lemmon Survey || FLO || align=right data-sort-value="0.83" | 830 m || 
|-id=612 bgcolor=#fefefe
| 305612 ||  || — || December 30, 2008 || Catalina || CSS || FLO || align=right data-sort-value="0.64" | 640 m || 
|-id=613 bgcolor=#fefefe
| 305613 ||  || — || December 22, 2008 || Socorro || LINEAR || — || align=right | 3.8 km || 
|-id=614 bgcolor=#fefefe
| 305614 ||  || — || December 31, 2008 || Kitt Peak || Spacewatch || — || align=right data-sort-value="0.96" | 960 m || 
|-id=615 bgcolor=#fefefe
| 305615 ||  || — || January 2, 2009 || Weihai || Shandong University Obs. || V || align=right data-sort-value="0.75" | 750 m || 
|-id=616 bgcolor=#fefefe
| 305616 ||  || — || January 2, 2009 || Mount Lemmon || Mount Lemmon Survey || — || align=right data-sort-value="0.87" | 870 m || 
|-id=617 bgcolor=#fefefe
| 305617 ||  || — || January 15, 2009 || Farra d'Isonzo || Farra d'Isonzo || — || align=right data-sort-value="0.85" | 850 m || 
|-id=618 bgcolor=#E9E9E9
| 305618 ||  || — || January 2, 2009 || Mount Lemmon || Mount Lemmon Survey || — || align=right | 1.2 km || 
|-id=619 bgcolor=#E9E9E9
| 305619 ||  || — || January 3, 2009 || Kitt Peak || Spacewatch || — || align=right | 2.7 km || 
|-id=620 bgcolor=#E9E9E9
| 305620 ||  || — || January 3, 2009 || Kitt Peak || Spacewatch || — || align=right | 1.1 km || 
|-id=621 bgcolor=#fefefe
| 305621 ||  || — || January 15, 2009 || Kitt Peak || Spacewatch || NYS || align=right data-sort-value="0.78" | 780 m || 
|-id=622 bgcolor=#fefefe
| 305622 ||  || — || January 15, 2009 || Kitt Peak || Spacewatch || V || align=right data-sort-value="0.75" | 750 m || 
|-id=623 bgcolor=#E9E9E9
| 305623 ||  || — || January 15, 2009 || Kitt Peak || Spacewatch || — || align=right | 1.8 km || 
|-id=624 bgcolor=#fefefe
| 305624 ||  || — || January 15, 2009 || Kitt Peak || Spacewatch || FLO || align=right data-sort-value="0.83" | 830 m || 
|-id=625 bgcolor=#E9E9E9
| 305625 ||  || — || January 15, 2009 || Kitt Peak || Spacewatch || — || align=right | 1.3 km || 
|-id=626 bgcolor=#fefefe
| 305626 ||  || — || January 15, 2009 || Kitt Peak || Spacewatch || — || align=right data-sort-value="0.76" | 760 m || 
|-id=627 bgcolor=#d6d6d6
| 305627 ||  || — || January 2, 2009 || Kitt Peak || Spacewatch || — || align=right | 3.4 km || 
|-id=628 bgcolor=#fefefe
| 305628 ||  || — || January 19, 2009 || Mayhill || A. Lowe || — || align=right data-sort-value="0.95" | 950 m || 
|-id=629 bgcolor=#fefefe
| 305629 ||  || — || January 17, 2009 || Socorro || LINEAR || NYS || align=right data-sort-value="0.66" | 660 m || 
|-id=630 bgcolor=#fefefe
| 305630 ||  || — || January 18, 2009 || Socorro || LINEAR || — || align=right | 1.5 km || 
|-id=631 bgcolor=#E9E9E9
| 305631 ||  || — || January 26, 2009 || Wildberg || R. Apitzsch || AER || align=right | 1.5 km || 
|-id=632 bgcolor=#fefefe
| 305632 ||  || — || January 22, 2009 || Socorro || LINEAR || FLO || align=right | 1.0 km || 
|-id=633 bgcolor=#E9E9E9
| 305633 ||  || — || January 17, 2009 || Kitt Peak || Spacewatch || — || align=right | 1.2 km || 
|-id=634 bgcolor=#fefefe
| 305634 ||  || — || January 18, 2009 || Kitt Peak || Spacewatch || — || align=right | 1.2 km || 
|-id=635 bgcolor=#fefefe
| 305635 ||  || — || January 19, 2009 || Mount Lemmon || Mount Lemmon Survey || NYS || align=right data-sort-value="0.96" | 960 m || 
|-id=636 bgcolor=#fefefe
| 305636 ||  || — || January 16, 2009 || Kitt Peak || Spacewatch || MAS || align=right data-sort-value="0.83" | 830 m || 
|-id=637 bgcolor=#fefefe
| 305637 ||  || — || January 16, 2009 || Kitt Peak || Spacewatch || MAS || align=right data-sort-value="0.90" | 900 m || 
|-id=638 bgcolor=#fefefe
| 305638 ||  || — || January 16, 2009 || Kitt Peak || Spacewatch || NYS || align=right data-sort-value="0.77" | 770 m || 
|-id=639 bgcolor=#fefefe
| 305639 ||  || — || January 16, 2009 || Kitt Peak || Spacewatch || V || align=right data-sort-value="0.89" | 890 m || 
|-id=640 bgcolor=#E9E9E9
| 305640 ||  || — || January 16, 2009 || Kitt Peak || Spacewatch || HNS || align=right | 1.8 km || 
|-id=641 bgcolor=#E9E9E9
| 305641 ||  || — || January 16, 2009 || Kitt Peak || Spacewatch || — || align=right | 1.2 km || 
|-id=642 bgcolor=#fefefe
| 305642 ||  || — || January 16, 2009 || Kitt Peak || Spacewatch || NYS || align=right data-sort-value="0.82" | 820 m || 
|-id=643 bgcolor=#fefefe
| 305643 ||  || — || January 16, 2009 || Kitt Peak || Spacewatch || NYS || align=right data-sort-value="0.80" | 800 m || 
|-id=644 bgcolor=#E9E9E9
| 305644 ||  || — || January 16, 2009 || Kitt Peak || Spacewatch || — || align=right | 1.3 km || 
|-id=645 bgcolor=#E9E9E9
| 305645 ||  || — || January 16, 2009 || Kitt Peak || Spacewatch || — || align=right | 1.3 km || 
|-id=646 bgcolor=#fefefe
| 305646 ||  || — || January 16, 2009 || Mount Lemmon || Mount Lemmon Survey || V || align=right data-sort-value="0.85" | 850 m || 
|-id=647 bgcolor=#E9E9E9
| 305647 ||  || — || January 16, 2009 || Kitt Peak || Spacewatch || — || align=right | 1.7 km || 
|-id=648 bgcolor=#fefefe
| 305648 ||  || — || January 16, 2009 || Mount Lemmon || Mount Lemmon Survey || — || align=right data-sort-value="0.81" | 810 m || 
|-id=649 bgcolor=#fefefe
| 305649 ||  || — || January 16, 2009 || Mount Lemmon || Mount Lemmon Survey || — || align=right data-sort-value="0.98" | 980 m || 
|-id=650 bgcolor=#fefefe
| 305650 ||  || — || January 16, 2009 || Mount Lemmon || Mount Lemmon Survey || NYS || align=right data-sort-value="0.73" | 730 m || 
|-id=651 bgcolor=#fefefe
| 305651 ||  || — || January 16, 2009 || Mount Lemmon || Mount Lemmon Survey || — || align=right | 1.3 km || 
|-id=652 bgcolor=#fefefe
| 305652 ||  || — || January 17, 2009 || Catalina || CSS || V || align=right data-sort-value="0.85" | 850 m || 
|-id=653 bgcolor=#E9E9E9
| 305653 ||  || — || January 20, 2009 || Kitt Peak || Spacewatch || — || align=right | 2.8 km || 
|-id=654 bgcolor=#fefefe
| 305654 ||  || — || January 18, 2009 || Mount Lemmon || Mount Lemmon Survey || NYS || align=right data-sort-value="0.65" | 650 m || 
|-id=655 bgcolor=#fefefe
| 305655 ||  || — || January 20, 2009 || Kitt Peak || Spacewatch || NYS || align=right data-sort-value="0.72" | 720 m || 
|-id=656 bgcolor=#fefefe
| 305656 ||  || — || January 25, 2009 || Kitt Peak || Spacewatch || NYS || align=right data-sort-value="0.88" | 880 m || 
|-id=657 bgcolor=#fefefe
| 305657 ||  || — || January 25, 2009 || Catalina || CSS || NYS || align=right data-sort-value="0.74" | 740 m || 
|-id=658 bgcolor=#fefefe
| 305658 ||  || — || January 26, 2009 || Purple Mountain || PMO NEO || — || align=right | 1.1 km || 
|-id=659 bgcolor=#fefefe
| 305659 ||  || — || January 29, 2009 || Socorro || LINEAR || NYS || align=right data-sort-value="0.82" | 820 m || 
|-id=660 bgcolor=#E9E9E9
| 305660 Romyhaag ||  ||  || January 29, 2009 || Calar Alto || F. Hormuth || — || align=right | 2.0 km || 
|-id=661 bgcolor=#fefefe
| 305661 Joejackson ||  ||  || January 29, 2009 || Calar Alto || F. Hormuth || MAS || align=right data-sort-value="0.45" | 450 m || 
|-id=662 bgcolor=#fefefe
| 305662 ||  || — || January 26, 2009 || Purple Mountain || PMO NEO || — || align=right | 1.2 km || 
|-id=663 bgcolor=#fefefe
| 305663 ||  || — || January 25, 2009 || Socorro || LINEAR || — || align=right | 1.2 km || 
|-id=664 bgcolor=#fefefe
| 305664 ||  || — || January 31, 2009 || Socorro || LINEAR || — || align=right | 1.1 km || 
|-id=665 bgcolor=#fefefe
| 305665 ||  || — || January 31, 2009 || Socorro || LINEAR || — || align=right | 1.3 km || 
|-id=666 bgcolor=#fefefe
| 305666 ||  || — || January 31, 2009 || Sierra Stars || F. Tozzi || PHO || align=right | 1.3 km || 
|-id=667 bgcolor=#fefefe
| 305667 ||  || — || January 20, 2009 || Catalina || CSS || KLI || align=right | 2.9 km || 
|-id=668 bgcolor=#fefefe
| 305668 ||  || — || January 25, 2009 || Kitt Peak || Spacewatch || NYS || align=right data-sort-value="0.67" | 670 m || 
|-id=669 bgcolor=#fefefe
| 305669 ||  || — || January 25, 2009 || Kitt Peak || Spacewatch || MAS || align=right data-sort-value="0.94" | 940 m || 
|-id=670 bgcolor=#fefefe
| 305670 ||  || — || January 25, 2009 || Kitt Peak || Spacewatch || V || align=right data-sort-value="0.80" | 800 m || 
|-id=671 bgcolor=#fefefe
| 305671 ||  || — || January 25, 2009 || Kitt Peak || Spacewatch || — || align=right data-sort-value="0.75" | 750 m || 
|-id=672 bgcolor=#fefefe
| 305672 ||  || — || January 25, 2009 || Kitt Peak || Spacewatch || V || align=right data-sort-value="0.78" | 780 m || 
|-id=673 bgcolor=#fefefe
| 305673 ||  || — || January 25, 2009 || Kitt Peak || Spacewatch || — || align=right data-sort-value="0.96" | 960 m || 
|-id=674 bgcolor=#fefefe
| 305674 ||  || — || January 25, 2009 || Kitt Peak || Spacewatch || — || align=right data-sort-value="0.98" | 980 m || 
|-id=675 bgcolor=#E9E9E9
| 305675 ||  || — || January 28, 2009 || Catalina || CSS || — || align=right | 2.0 km || 
|-id=676 bgcolor=#fefefe
| 305676 ||  || — || January 29, 2009 || Kitt Peak || Spacewatch || — || align=right | 1.1 km || 
|-id=677 bgcolor=#d6d6d6
| 305677 ||  || — || January 25, 2009 || Kitt Peak || Spacewatch || — || align=right | 2.5 km || 
|-id=678 bgcolor=#fefefe
| 305678 ||  || — || January 25, 2009 || Kitt Peak || Spacewatch || — || align=right | 1.1 km || 
|-id=679 bgcolor=#fefefe
| 305679 ||  || — || January 26, 2009 || Purple Mountain || PMO NEO || NYS || align=right data-sort-value="0.71" | 710 m || 
|-id=680 bgcolor=#fefefe
| 305680 ||  || — || January 29, 2009 || Kitt Peak || Spacewatch || — || align=right | 1.0 km || 
|-id=681 bgcolor=#fefefe
| 305681 ||  || — || January 29, 2009 || Mount Lemmon || Mount Lemmon Survey || NYS || align=right data-sort-value="0.67" | 670 m || 
|-id=682 bgcolor=#fefefe
| 305682 ||  || — || January 26, 2009 || Kitt Peak || Spacewatch || — || align=right | 1.1 km || 
|-id=683 bgcolor=#E9E9E9
| 305683 ||  || — || January 29, 2009 || Mount Lemmon || Mount Lemmon Survey || — || align=right | 2.0 km || 
|-id=684 bgcolor=#E9E9E9
| 305684 ||  || — || January 31, 2009 || Kitt Peak || Spacewatch || — || align=right data-sort-value="0.87" | 870 m || 
|-id=685 bgcolor=#E9E9E9
| 305685 ||  || — || January 31, 2009 || Kitt Peak || Spacewatch || — || align=right | 2.7 km || 
|-id=686 bgcolor=#E9E9E9
| 305686 ||  || — || January 31, 2009 || Kitt Peak || Spacewatch || — || align=right data-sort-value="0.97" | 970 m || 
|-id=687 bgcolor=#fefefe
| 305687 ||  || — || January 26, 2009 || Mount Lemmon || Mount Lemmon Survey || — || align=right data-sort-value="0.98" | 980 m || 
|-id=688 bgcolor=#E9E9E9
| 305688 ||  || — || January 29, 2009 || Kitt Peak || Spacewatch || — || align=right | 1.3 km || 
|-id=689 bgcolor=#E9E9E9
| 305689 ||  || — || January 30, 2009 || Mount Lemmon || Mount Lemmon Survey || — || align=right | 1.2 km || 
|-id=690 bgcolor=#E9E9E9
| 305690 ||  || — || January 31, 2009 || Mount Lemmon || Mount Lemmon Survey || — || align=right | 2.8 km || 
|-id=691 bgcolor=#fefefe
| 305691 ||  || — || January 31, 2009 || Mount Lemmon || Mount Lemmon Survey || — || align=right | 1.1 km || 
|-id=692 bgcolor=#d6d6d6
| 305692 ||  || — || January 31, 2009 || Mount Lemmon || Mount Lemmon Survey || TIR || align=right | 3.8 km || 
|-id=693 bgcolor=#fefefe
| 305693 ||  || — || January 31, 2009 || Mount Lemmon || Mount Lemmon Survey || V || align=right data-sort-value="0.65" | 650 m || 
|-id=694 bgcolor=#E9E9E9
| 305694 ||  || — || January 29, 2009 || Kitt Peak || Spacewatch || — || align=right | 1.1 km || 
|-id=695 bgcolor=#fefefe
| 305695 ||  || — || January 30, 2009 || Mount Lemmon || Mount Lemmon Survey || FLO || align=right data-sort-value="0.68" | 680 m || 
|-id=696 bgcolor=#E9E9E9
| 305696 ||  || — || January 30, 2009 || Mount Lemmon || Mount Lemmon Survey || — || align=right | 1.2 km || 
|-id=697 bgcolor=#E9E9E9
| 305697 ||  || — || January 31, 2009 || Kitt Peak || Spacewatch || KON || align=right | 3.6 km || 
|-id=698 bgcolor=#E9E9E9
| 305698 ||  || — || January 31, 2009 || Kitt Peak || Spacewatch || — || align=right | 1.1 km || 
|-id=699 bgcolor=#fefefe
| 305699 ||  || — || January 31, 2009 || Kitt Peak || Spacewatch || — || align=right data-sort-value="0.69" | 690 m || 
|-id=700 bgcolor=#fefefe
| 305700 ||  || — || January 31, 2009 || Kitt Peak || Spacewatch || — || align=right data-sort-value="0.70" | 700 m || 
|}

305701–305800 

|-bgcolor=#fefefe
| 305701 ||  || — || January 31, 2009 || Mount Lemmon || Mount Lemmon Survey || NYS || align=right data-sort-value="0.65" | 650 m || 
|-id=702 bgcolor=#fefefe
| 305702 ||  || — || January 25, 2009 || Cerro Burek || Alianza S4 Obs. || — || align=right | 1.3 km || 
|-id=703 bgcolor=#fefefe
| 305703 ||  || — || January 29, 2009 || Cerro Burek || Alianza S4 Obs. || FLO || align=right data-sort-value="0.74" | 740 m || 
|-id=704 bgcolor=#E9E9E9
| 305704 ||  || — || January 18, 2009 || Kitt Peak || Spacewatch || — || align=right data-sort-value="0.94" | 940 m || 
|-id=705 bgcolor=#fefefe
| 305705 ||  || — || January 26, 2009 || Catalina || CSS || — || align=right | 1.1 km || 
|-id=706 bgcolor=#E9E9E9
| 305706 ||  || — || January 31, 2009 || Kitt Peak || Spacewatch || — || align=right | 1.6 km || 
|-id=707 bgcolor=#fefefe
| 305707 ||  || — || January 31, 2009 || Kitt Peak || Spacewatch || NYS || align=right data-sort-value="0.68" | 680 m || 
|-id=708 bgcolor=#fefefe
| 305708 ||  || — || January 18, 2009 || Kitt Peak || Spacewatch || — || align=right data-sort-value="0.89" | 890 m || 
|-id=709 bgcolor=#E9E9E9
| 305709 ||  || — || January 20, 2009 || Mount Lemmon || Mount Lemmon Survey || — || align=right data-sort-value="0.87" | 870 m || 
|-id=710 bgcolor=#fefefe
| 305710 ||  || — || January 18, 2009 || Kitt Peak || Spacewatch || — || align=right data-sort-value="0.80" | 800 m || 
|-id=711 bgcolor=#E9E9E9
| 305711 ||  || — || January 17, 2009 || Mount Lemmon || Mount Lemmon Survey || — || align=right | 1.3 km || 
|-id=712 bgcolor=#fefefe
| 305712 ||  || — || January 18, 2009 || Catalina || CSS || — || align=right data-sort-value="0.84" | 840 m || 
|-id=713 bgcolor=#E9E9E9
| 305713 ||  || — || January 16, 2009 || Kitt Peak || Spacewatch || NEM || align=right | 2.7 km || 
|-id=714 bgcolor=#fefefe
| 305714 ||  || — || January 17, 2009 || Kitt Peak || Spacewatch || — || align=right data-sort-value="0.64" | 640 m || 
|-id=715 bgcolor=#d6d6d6
| 305715 ||  || — || January 30, 2009 || Mount Lemmon || Mount Lemmon Survey || — || align=right | 3.1 km || 
|-id=716 bgcolor=#fefefe
| 305716 ||  || — || February 14, 2009 || Great Shefford || P. Birtwhistle || FLO || align=right data-sort-value="0.75" | 750 m || 
|-id=717 bgcolor=#E9E9E9
| 305717 ||  || — || February 1, 2009 || Catalina || CSS || RAF || align=right | 1.1 km || 
|-id=718 bgcolor=#fefefe
| 305718 ||  || — || February 1, 2009 || Mount Lemmon || Mount Lemmon Survey || — || align=right data-sort-value="0.87" | 870 m || 
|-id=719 bgcolor=#fefefe
| 305719 ||  || — || February 2, 2009 || Mount Lemmon || Mount Lemmon Survey || — || align=right data-sort-value="0.94" | 940 m || 
|-id=720 bgcolor=#fefefe
| 305720 ||  || — || February 1, 2009 || Kitt Peak || Spacewatch || — || align=right data-sort-value="0.98" | 980 m || 
|-id=721 bgcolor=#E9E9E9
| 305721 ||  || — || February 1, 2009 || Kitt Peak || Spacewatch || — || align=right | 2.5 km || 
|-id=722 bgcolor=#E9E9E9
| 305722 ||  || — || February 1, 2009 || Kitt Peak || Spacewatch || — || align=right | 1.5 km || 
|-id=723 bgcolor=#fefefe
| 305723 ||  || — || February 1, 2009 || Kitt Peak || Spacewatch || MAS || align=right data-sort-value="0.93" | 930 m || 
|-id=724 bgcolor=#fefefe
| 305724 ||  || — || February 1, 2009 || Kitt Peak || Spacewatch || — || align=right data-sort-value="0.87" | 870 m || 
|-id=725 bgcolor=#fefefe
| 305725 ||  || — || February 1, 2009 || Kitt Peak || Spacewatch || MAS || align=right data-sort-value="0.75" | 750 m || 
|-id=726 bgcolor=#E9E9E9
| 305726 ||  || — || February 1, 2009 || Kitt Peak || Spacewatch || — || align=right | 1.2 km || 
|-id=727 bgcolor=#E9E9E9
| 305727 ||  || — || February 4, 2009 || Catalina || CSS || — || align=right | 1.2 km || 
|-id=728 bgcolor=#fefefe
| 305728 ||  || — || February 15, 2009 || Dauban || F. Kugel || EUT || align=right data-sort-value="0.70" | 700 m || 
|-id=729 bgcolor=#fefefe
| 305729 ||  || — || February 13, 2009 || Kitt Peak || Spacewatch || LCI || align=right | 1.0 km || 
|-id=730 bgcolor=#fefefe
| 305730 ||  || — || February 13, 2009 || Kitt Peak || Spacewatch || NYS || align=right data-sort-value="0.82" | 820 m || 
|-id=731 bgcolor=#fefefe
| 305731 ||  || — || February 14, 2009 || Kitt Peak || Spacewatch || — || align=right | 1.0 km || 
|-id=732 bgcolor=#E9E9E9
| 305732 ||  || — || February 13, 2009 || Kitt Peak || Spacewatch || RAF || align=right | 1.1 km || 
|-id=733 bgcolor=#E9E9E9
| 305733 ||  || — || February 14, 2009 || Mount Lemmon || Mount Lemmon Survey || HEN || align=right | 1.1 km || 
|-id=734 bgcolor=#fefefe
| 305734 ||  || — || February 14, 2009 || Mount Lemmon || Mount Lemmon Survey || — || align=right | 1.1 km || 
|-id=735 bgcolor=#fefefe
| 305735 ||  || — || February 14, 2009 || Kitt Peak || Spacewatch || — || align=right | 1.0 km || 
|-id=736 bgcolor=#fefefe
| 305736 ||  || — || February 14, 2009 || Kitt Peak || Spacewatch || — || align=right data-sort-value="0.83" | 830 m || 
|-id=737 bgcolor=#E9E9E9
| 305737 ||  || — || February 14, 2009 || Kitt Peak || Spacewatch || MRX || align=right | 1.3 km || 
|-id=738 bgcolor=#E9E9E9
| 305738 ||  || — || February 14, 2009 || Kitt Peak || Spacewatch || HOF || align=right | 3.0 km || 
|-id=739 bgcolor=#fefefe
| 305739 ||  || — || November 3, 2004 || Kitt Peak || Spacewatch || NYS || align=right data-sort-value="0.65" | 650 m || 
|-id=740 bgcolor=#E9E9E9
| 305740 ||  || — || February 13, 2009 || Kitt Peak || Spacewatch || — || align=right | 2.1 km || 
|-id=741 bgcolor=#E9E9E9
| 305741 ||  || — || February 2, 2009 || Catalina || CSS || — || align=right | 1.4 km || 
|-id=742 bgcolor=#E9E9E9
| 305742 ||  || — || February 5, 2009 || Mount Lemmon || Mount Lemmon Survey || JUN || align=right | 1.3 km || 
|-id=743 bgcolor=#E9E9E9
| 305743 ||  || — || February 1, 2009 || Mount Lemmon || Mount Lemmon Survey || — || align=right | 3.2 km || 
|-id=744 bgcolor=#E9E9E9
| 305744 ||  || — || February 2, 2009 || Mount Lemmon || Mount Lemmon Survey || — || align=right | 1.9 km || 
|-id=745 bgcolor=#fefefe
| 305745 ||  || — || February 2, 2009 || Catalina || CSS || V || align=right data-sort-value="0.99" | 990 m || 
|-id=746 bgcolor=#fefefe
| 305746 ||  || — || February 3, 2009 || Kitt Peak || Spacewatch || MAS || align=right data-sort-value="0.82" | 820 m || 
|-id=747 bgcolor=#E9E9E9
| 305747 ||  || — || February 16, 2009 || Dauban || F. Kugel || — || align=right | 1.8 km || 
|-id=748 bgcolor=#fefefe
| 305748 ||  || — || February 16, 2009 || Bisei SG Center || BATTeRS || — || align=right | 1.2 km || 
|-id=749 bgcolor=#E9E9E9
| 305749 ||  || — || February 20, 2009 || Calar Alto || F. Hormuth || — || align=right | 1.8 km || 
|-id=750 bgcolor=#fefefe
| 305750 ||  || — || February 17, 2009 || Kitt Peak || Spacewatch || NYS || align=right data-sort-value="0.74" | 740 m || 
|-id=751 bgcolor=#d6d6d6
| 305751 ||  || — || February 19, 2009 || Kitt Peak || Spacewatch || — || align=right | 4.4 km || 
|-id=752 bgcolor=#E9E9E9
| 305752 ||  || — || February 19, 2009 || Mount Lemmon || Mount Lemmon Survey || — || align=right | 2.2 km || 
|-id=753 bgcolor=#fefefe
| 305753 ||  || — || February 19, 2009 || Mount Lemmon || Mount Lemmon Survey || — || align=right | 1.0 km || 
|-id=754 bgcolor=#d6d6d6
| 305754 ||  || — || February 21, 2009 || Tzec Maun || S. Karge || LAU || align=right | 1.3 km || 
|-id=755 bgcolor=#fefefe
| 305755 ||  || — || February 17, 2009 || Socorro || LINEAR || NYS || align=right data-sort-value="0.87" | 870 m || 
|-id=756 bgcolor=#fefefe
| 305756 ||  || — || February 16, 2009 || Kitt Peak || Spacewatch || — || align=right data-sort-value="0.75" | 750 m || 
|-id=757 bgcolor=#fefefe
| 305757 ||  || — || February 16, 2009 || La Sagra || OAM Obs. || NYS || align=right data-sort-value="0.59" | 590 m || 
|-id=758 bgcolor=#fefefe
| 305758 ||  || — || February 16, 2009 || La Sagra || OAM Obs. || MAS || align=right data-sort-value="0.94" | 940 m || 
|-id=759 bgcolor=#fefefe
| 305759 ||  || — || February 17, 2009 || La Sagra || OAM Obs. || NYS || align=right data-sort-value="0.78" | 780 m || 
|-id=760 bgcolor=#E9E9E9
| 305760 ||  || — || February 21, 2009 || La Sagra || OAM Obs. || HNS || align=right | 1.6 km || 
|-id=761 bgcolor=#E9E9E9
| 305761 ||  || — || February 21, 2009 || Kitt Peak || Spacewatch || — || align=right | 1.9 km || 
|-id=762 bgcolor=#d6d6d6
| 305762 ||  || — || February 21, 2009 || Kitt Peak || Spacewatch || — || align=right | 3.1 km || 
|-id=763 bgcolor=#E9E9E9
| 305763 ||  || — || February 23, 2009 || Calar Alto || F. Hormuth || PAD || align=right | 1.6 km || 
|-id=764 bgcolor=#fefefe
| 305764 ||  || — || February 22, 2009 || La Sagra || OAM Obs. || — || align=right | 1.4 km || 
|-id=765 bgcolor=#d6d6d6
| 305765 ||  || — || February 20, 2009 || Kitt Peak || Spacewatch || — || align=right | 2.4 km || 
|-id=766 bgcolor=#fefefe
| 305766 ||  || — || February 20, 2009 || Kitt Peak || Spacewatch || NYS || align=right data-sort-value="0.70" | 700 m || 
|-id=767 bgcolor=#E9E9E9
| 305767 ||  || — || February 20, 2009 || Kitt Peak || Spacewatch || — || align=right | 1.7 km || 
|-id=768 bgcolor=#E9E9E9
| 305768 ||  || — || February 23, 2009 || Calar Alto || F. Hormuth || — || align=right | 1.4 km || 
|-id=769 bgcolor=#d6d6d6
| 305769 ||  || — || February 23, 2009 || Dauban || F. Kugel || URS || align=right | 4.0 km || 
|-id=770 bgcolor=#E9E9E9
| 305770 ||  || — || February 16, 2009 || La Sagra || OAM Obs. || — || align=right | 1.2 km || 
|-id=771 bgcolor=#fefefe
| 305771 ||  || — || February 18, 2009 || La Sagra || OAM Obs. || MAS || align=right data-sort-value="0.96" | 960 m || 
|-id=772 bgcolor=#E9E9E9
| 305772 ||  || — || February 22, 2009 || La Sagra || OAM Obs. || JUN || align=right | 1.5 km || 
|-id=773 bgcolor=#fefefe
| 305773 ||  || — || February 18, 2009 || La Sagra || OAM Obs. || — || align=right data-sort-value="0.83" | 830 m || 
|-id=774 bgcolor=#E9E9E9
| 305774 ||  || — || February 23, 2009 || Socorro || LINEAR || — || align=right | 1.1 km || 
|-id=775 bgcolor=#fefefe
| 305775 ||  || — || February 25, 2009 || Marly || P. Kocher || — || align=right | 1.5 km || 
|-id=776 bgcolor=#fefefe
| 305776 ||  || — || February 27, 2009 || Vicques || M. Ory || V || align=right data-sort-value="0.90" | 900 m || 
|-id=777 bgcolor=#fefefe
| 305777 ||  || — || January 29, 2009 || Mount Lemmon || Mount Lemmon Survey || — || align=right | 1.0 km || 
|-id=778 bgcolor=#fefefe
| 305778 ||  || — || February 19, 2009 || Kitt Peak || Spacewatch || MAS || align=right data-sort-value="0.69" | 690 m || 
|-id=779 bgcolor=#E9E9E9
| 305779 ||  || — || February 19, 2009 || Kitt Peak || Spacewatch || MRX || align=right | 1.1 km || 
|-id=780 bgcolor=#fefefe
| 305780 ||  || — || February 19, 2009 || Kitt Peak || Spacewatch || — || align=right data-sort-value="0.80" | 800 m || 
|-id=781 bgcolor=#fefefe
| 305781 ||  || — || February 19, 2009 || Kitt Peak || Spacewatch || NYS || align=right data-sort-value="0.52" | 520 m || 
|-id=782 bgcolor=#fefefe
| 305782 ||  || — || February 22, 2009 || Kitt Peak || Spacewatch || NYS || align=right data-sort-value="0.79" | 790 m || 
|-id=783 bgcolor=#d6d6d6
| 305783 ||  || — || February 22, 2009 || Kitt Peak || Spacewatch || — || align=right | 3.6 km || 
|-id=784 bgcolor=#E9E9E9
| 305784 ||  || — || February 22, 2009 || Kitt Peak || Spacewatch || — || align=right | 1.6 km || 
|-id=785 bgcolor=#fefefe
| 305785 ||  || — || February 22, 2009 || Kitt Peak || Spacewatch || — || align=right | 1.0 km || 
|-id=786 bgcolor=#E9E9E9
| 305786 ||  || — || February 22, 2009 || Kitt Peak || Spacewatch || — || align=right | 1.1 km || 
|-id=787 bgcolor=#E9E9E9
| 305787 ||  || — || February 19, 2009 || Kitt Peak || Spacewatch || — || align=right | 2.4 km || 
|-id=788 bgcolor=#fefefe
| 305788 ||  || — || February 26, 2009 || Catalina || CSS || NYS || align=right data-sort-value="0.69" | 690 m || 
|-id=789 bgcolor=#fefefe
| 305789 ||  || — || February 18, 2009 || La Sagra || OAM Obs. || MAS || align=right data-sort-value="0.85" | 850 m || 
|-id=790 bgcolor=#fefefe
| 305790 ||  || — || February 19, 2009 || Catalina || CSS || — || align=right data-sort-value="0.83" | 830 m || 
|-id=791 bgcolor=#E9E9E9
| 305791 ||  || — || February 19, 2009 || Catalina || CSS || — || align=right | 2.1 km || 
|-id=792 bgcolor=#fefefe
| 305792 ||  || — || February 21, 2009 || Mount Lemmon || Mount Lemmon Survey || — || align=right data-sort-value="0.71" | 710 m || 
|-id=793 bgcolor=#E9E9E9
| 305793 ||  || — || February 21, 2009 || Mount Lemmon || Mount Lemmon Survey || — || align=right | 1.9 km || 
|-id=794 bgcolor=#d6d6d6
| 305794 ||  || — || February 24, 2009 || Kitt Peak || Spacewatch || — || align=right | 3.1 km || 
|-id=795 bgcolor=#E9E9E9
| 305795 ||  || — || February 24, 2009 || Kitt Peak || Spacewatch || — || align=right | 1.7 km || 
|-id=796 bgcolor=#d6d6d6
| 305796 ||  || — || February 26, 2009 || Kitt Peak || Spacewatch || KOR || align=right | 1.7 km || 
|-id=797 bgcolor=#d6d6d6
| 305797 ||  || — || February 26, 2009 || Kitt Peak || Spacewatch || — || align=right | 3.1 km || 
|-id=798 bgcolor=#E9E9E9
| 305798 ||  || — || February 27, 2009 || Kitt Peak || Spacewatch || — || align=right | 1.8 km || 
|-id=799 bgcolor=#d6d6d6
| 305799 ||  || — || February 22, 2009 || Kitt Peak || Spacewatch || — || align=right | 2.7 km || 
|-id=800 bgcolor=#E9E9E9
| 305800 ||  || — || February 26, 2009 || Mount Lemmon || Mount Lemmon Survey || — || align=right | 1.3 km || 
|}

305801–305900 

|-bgcolor=#E9E9E9
| 305801 ||  || — || February 26, 2009 || Kitt Peak || Spacewatch || — || align=right | 1.1 km || 
|-id=802 bgcolor=#E9E9E9
| 305802 ||  || — || February 28, 2009 || Kitt Peak || Spacewatch || — || align=right data-sort-value="0.98" | 980 m || 
|-id=803 bgcolor=#E9E9E9
| 305803 ||  || — || February 28, 2009 || Mount Lemmon || Mount Lemmon Survey || — || align=right data-sort-value="0.94" | 940 m || 
|-id=804 bgcolor=#E9E9E9
| 305804 ||  || — || February 28, 2009 || Mount Lemmon || Mount Lemmon Survey || BRG || align=right | 1.8 km || 
|-id=805 bgcolor=#fefefe
| 305805 ||  || — || February 25, 2009 || Catalina || CSS || — || align=right data-sort-value="0.81" | 810 m || 
|-id=806 bgcolor=#E9E9E9
| 305806 ||  || — || October 21, 2007 || Kitt Peak || Spacewatch || — || align=right | 1.3 km || 
|-id=807 bgcolor=#E9E9E9
| 305807 ||  || — || February 26, 2009 || Kitt Peak || Spacewatch || — || align=right | 1.7 km || 
|-id=808 bgcolor=#fefefe
| 305808 ||  || — || February 26, 2009 || Kitt Peak || Spacewatch || NYS || align=right data-sort-value="0.70" | 700 m || 
|-id=809 bgcolor=#E9E9E9
| 305809 ||  || — || February 26, 2009 || Kitt Peak || Spacewatch || — || align=right | 2.9 km || 
|-id=810 bgcolor=#E9E9E9
| 305810 ||  || — || February 26, 2009 || Kitt Peak || Spacewatch || — || align=right | 3.3 km || 
|-id=811 bgcolor=#E9E9E9
| 305811 ||  || — || February 26, 2009 || Kitt Peak || Spacewatch || AEO || align=right | 1.3 km || 
|-id=812 bgcolor=#E9E9E9
| 305812 ||  || — || February 26, 2009 || Kitt Peak || Spacewatch || — || align=right | 2.5 km || 
|-id=813 bgcolor=#E9E9E9
| 305813 ||  || — || February 26, 2009 || Kitt Peak || Spacewatch || HEN || align=right | 1.0 km || 
|-id=814 bgcolor=#fefefe
| 305814 ||  || — || February 24, 2009 || Catalina || CSS || — || align=right data-sort-value="0.97" | 970 m || 
|-id=815 bgcolor=#fefefe
| 305815 ||  || — || February 19, 2009 || Catalina || CSS || — || align=right | 1.2 km || 
|-id=816 bgcolor=#fefefe
| 305816 ||  || — || February 27, 2009 || Kitt Peak || Spacewatch || MAS || align=right data-sort-value="0.72" | 720 m || 
|-id=817 bgcolor=#E9E9E9
| 305817 ||  || — || February 27, 2009 || Kitt Peak || Spacewatch || NEM || align=right | 2.4 km || 
|-id=818 bgcolor=#E9E9E9
| 305818 ||  || — || February 27, 2009 || Kitt Peak || Spacewatch || AGN || align=right | 1.3 km || 
|-id=819 bgcolor=#fefefe
| 305819 ||  || — || February 27, 2009 || Kitt Peak || Spacewatch || — || align=right data-sort-value="0.85" | 850 m || 
|-id=820 bgcolor=#fefefe
| 305820 ||  || — || February 19, 2009 || Kitt Peak || Spacewatch || ERI || align=right | 1.4 km || 
|-id=821 bgcolor=#E9E9E9
| 305821 ||  || — || February 19, 2009 || Kitt Peak || Spacewatch || HEN || align=right | 1.4 km || 
|-id=822 bgcolor=#fefefe
| 305822 ||  || — || February 19, 2009 || Kitt Peak || Spacewatch || MAS || align=right data-sort-value="0.64" | 640 m || 
|-id=823 bgcolor=#E9E9E9
| 305823 ||  || — || February 20, 2009 || Kitt Peak || Spacewatch || — || align=right | 3.0 km || 
|-id=824 bgcolor=#E9E9E9
| 305824 ||  || — || February 20, 2009 || Kitt Peak || Spacewatch || NEM || align=right | 2.3 km || 
|-id=825 bgcolor=#E9E9E9
| 305825 ||  || — || February 20, 2009 || Kitt Peak || Spacewatch || HOF || align=right | 3.3 km || 
|-id=826 bgcolor=#fefefe
| 305826 ||  || — || February 20, 2009 || Mount Lemmon || Mount Lemmon Survey || — || align=right data-sort-value="0.89" | 890 m || 
|-id=827 bgcolor=#fefefe
| 305827 ||  || — || February 21, 2009 || Kitt Peak || Spacewatch || MAS || align=right data-sort-value="0.61" | 610 m || 
|-id=828 bgcolor=#E9E9E9
| 305828 ||  || — || February 22, 2009 || Kitt Peak || Spacewatch || — || align=right | 2.3 km || 
|-id=829 bgcolor=#E9E9E9
| 305829 ||  || — || February 24, 2009 || Kitt Peak || Spacewatch || HOF || align=right | 2.8 km || 
|-id=830 bgcolor=#d6d6d6
| 305830 ||  || — || February 24, 2009 || Kitt Peak || Spacewatch || — || align=right | 3.2 km || 
|-id=831 bgcolor=#E9E9E9
| 305831 ||  || — || August 28, 2006 || Kitt Peak || Spacewatch || AGN || align=right | 1.5 km || 
|-id=832 bgcolor=#fefefe
| 305832 ||  || — || February 27, 2009 || Kitt Peak || Spacewatch || NYS || align=right data-sort-value="0.69" | 690 m || 
|-id=833 bgcolor=#E9E9E9
| 305833 ||  || — || February 27, 2009 || Kitt Peak || Spacewatch || AGN || align=right | 1.2 km || 
|-id=834 bgcolor=#d6d6d6
| 305834 ||  || — || February 20, 2009 || Kitt Peak || Spacewatch || — || align=right | 5.2 km || 
|-id=835 bgcolor=#fefefe
| 305835 ||  || — || February 19, 2009 || Catalina || CSS || — || align=right | 1.2 km || 
|-id=836 bgcolor=#E9E9E9
| 305836 ||  || — || February 19, 2009 || Kitt Peak || Spacewatch || — || align=right data-sort-value="0.89" | 890 m || 
|-id=837 bgcolor=#fefefe
| 305837 ||  || — || February 19, 2009 || Kitt Peak || Spacewatch || MAS || align=right data-sort-value="0.87" | 870 m || 
|-id=838 bgcolor=#d6d6d6
| 305838 ||  || — || February 20, 2009 || Kitt Peak || Spacewatch || THM || align=right | 2.4 km || 
|-id=839 bgcolor=#fefefe
| 305839 ||  || — || February 20, 2009 || Kitt Peak || Spacewatch || — || align=right data-sort-value="0.72" | 720 m || 
|-id=840 bgcolor=#d6d6d6
| 305840 ||  || — || February 20, 2009 || Kitt Peak || Spacewatch || — || align=right | 2.5 km || 
|-id=841 bgcolor=#d6d6d6
| 305841 ||  || — || February 27, 2009 || Mount Lemmon || Mount Lemmon Survey || EUP || align=right | 5.1 km || 
|-id=842 bgcolor=#d6d6d6
| 305842 ||  || — || February 27, 2009 || Kitt Peak || Spacewatch || — || align=right | 3.7 km || 
|-id=843 bgcolor=#E9E9E9
| 305843 ||  || — || March 1, 2009 || Mayhill || A. Lowe || INO || align=right | 3.5 km || 
|-id=844 bgcolor=#fefefe
| 305844 ||  || — || March 2, 2009 || Calvin-Rehoboth || Calvin–Rehoboth Obs. || — || align=right | 1.4 km || 
|-id=845 bgcolor=#fefefe
| 305845 ||  || — || March 15, 2009 || Sandlot || G. Hug || NYS || align=right data-sort-value="0.74" | 740 m || 
|-id=846 bgcolor=#E9E9E9
| 305846 ||  || — || March 15, 2009 || La Sagra || OAM Obs. || AEO || align=right | 1.4 km || 
|-id=847 bgcolor=#fefefe
| 305847 ||  || — || March 15, 2009 || La Sagra || OAM Obs. || — || align=right data-sort-value="0.85" | 850 m || 
|-id=848 bgcolor=#fefefe
| 305848 ||  || — || March 15, 2009 || La Sagra || OAM Obs. || NYS || align=right data-sort-value="0.77" | 770 m || 
|-id=849 bgcolor=#d6d6d6
| 305849 ||  || — || March 15, 2009 || La Sagra || OAM Obs. || CHA || align=right | 2.8 km || 
|-id=850 bgcolor=#E9E9E9
| 305850 ||  || — || March 1, 2009 || Mount Lemmon || Mount Lemmon Survey || — || align=right | 1.8 km || 
|-id=851 bgcolor=#fefefe
| 305851 ||  || — || March 1, 2009 || Kitt Peak || Spacewatch || MAS || align=right data-sort-value="0.85" | 850 m || 
|-id=852 bgcolor=#E9E9E9
| 305852 ||  || — || March 2, 2009 || Mount Lemmon || Mount Lemmon Survey || — || align=right | 2.1 km || 
|-id=853 bgcolor=#fefefe
| 305853 ||  || — || March 1, 2009 || Kitt Peak || Spacewatch || NYS || align=right data-sort-value="0.76" | 760 m || 
|-id=854 bgcolor=#E9E9E9
| 305854 ||  || — || March 1, 2009 || Kitt Peak || Spacewatch || AEO || align=right | 1.5 km || 
|-id=855 bgcolor=#E9E9E9
| 305855 ||  || — || March 2, 2009 || Kitt Peak || Spacewatch || — || align=right | 1.2 km || 
|-id=856 bgcolor=#E9E9E9
| 305856 ||  || — || March 15, 2009 || Kitt Peak || Spacewatch || HOF || align=right | 4.0 km || 
|-id=857 bgcolor=#fefefe
| 305857 ||  || — || March 15, 2009 || Kitt Peak || Spacewatch || MAS || align=right data-sort-value="0.79" | 790 m || 
|-id=858 bgcolor=#E9E9E9
| 305858 ||  || — || March 15, 2009 || Kitt Peak || Spacewatch || — || align=right | 2.4 km || 
|-id=859 bgcolor=#E9E9E9
| 305859 ||  || — || March 15, 2009 || Kitt Peak || Spacewatch || AGN || align=right | 1.1 km || 
|-id=860 bgcolor=#fefefe
| 305860 ||  || — || March 15, 2009 || La Sagra || OAM Obs. || V || align=right | 1.0 km || 
|-id=861 bgcolor=#E9E9E9
| 305861 ||  || — || March 2, 2009 || Kitt Peak || Spacewatch || HOF || align=right | 3.4 km || 
|-id=862 bgcolor=#E9E9E9
| 305862 ||  || — || March 3, 2009 || Kitt Peak || Spacewatch || AST || align=right | 1.9 km || 
|-id=863 bgcolor=#E9E9E9
| 305863 ||  || — || March 3, 2009 || Mount Lemmon || Mount Lemmon Survey || — || align=right | 1.9 km || 
|-id=864 bgcolor=#E9E9E9
| 305864 ||  || — || March 7, 2009 || Mount Lemmon || Mount Lemmon Survey || ADE || align=right | 2.1 km || 
|-id=865 bgcolor=#E9E9E9
| 305865 ||  || — || March 7, 2009 || Mount Lemmon || Mount Lemmon Survey || — || align=right | 2.3 km || 
|-id=866 bgcolor=#E9E9E9
| 305866 ||  || — || March 1, 2009 || Kitt Peak || Spacewatch || — || align=right | 1.8 km || 
|-id=867 bgcolor=#E9E9E9
| 305867 ||  || — || March 1, 2009 || Kitt Peak || Spacewatch || — || align=right | 1.7 km || 
|-id=868 bgcolor=#fefefe
| 305868 ||  || — || March 1, 2009 || Mount Lemmon || Mount Lemmon Survey || — || align=right | 1.2 km || 
|-id=869 bgcolor=#E9E9E9
| 305869 ||  || — || March 7, 2009 || Mount Lemmon || Mount Lemmon Survey || — || align=right | 2.0 km || 
|-id=870 bgcolor=#E9E9E9
| 305870 ||  || — || March 15, 2009 || Kitt Peak || Spacewatch || GEF || align=right | 1.5 km || 
|-id=871 bgcolor=#d6d6d6
| 305871 ||  || — || March 17, 2009 || Sandlot || G. Hug || — || align=right | 2.5 km || 
|-id=872 bgcolor=#fefefe
| 305872 ||  || — || March 18, 2009 || Mayhill || A. Lowe || MAS || align=right data-sort-value="0.96" | 960 m || 
|-id=873 bgcolor=#E9E9E9
| 305873 ||  || — || March 19, 2009 || Mayhill || A. Lowe || — || align=right | 3.1 km || 
|-id=874 bgcolor=#E9E9E9
| 305874 ||  || — || March 18, 2009 || Dauban || F. Kugel || — || align=right | 1.9 km || 
|-id=875 bgcolor=#fefefe
| 305875 ||  || — || March 17, 2009 || Dauban || F. Kugel || NYS || align=right data-sort-value="0.87" | 870 m || 
|-id=876 bgcolor=#E9E9E9
| 305876 ||  || — || March 16, 2009 || Mount Lemmon || Mount Lemmon Survey || — || align=right | 1.7 km || 
|-id=877 bgcolor=#fefefe
| 305877 ||  || — || March 16, 2009 || Mount Lemmon || Mount Lemmon Survey || NYS || align=right data-sort-value="0.81" | 810 m || 
|-id=878 bgcolor=#fefefe
| 305878 ||  || — || March 18, 2009 || Mount Lemmon || Mount Lemmon Survey || MAS || align=right data-sort-value="0.71" | 710 m || 
|-id=879 bgcolor=#fefefe
| 305879 ||  || — || March 17, 2009 || Kitt Peak || Spacewatch || — || align=right data-sort-value="0.70" | 700 m || 
|-id=880 bgcolor=#E9E9E9
| 305880 ||  || — || March 17, 2009 || Kitt Peak || Spacewatch || HOF || align=right | 2.7 km || 
|-id=881 bgcolor=#E9E9E9
| 305881 ||  || — || March 19, 2009 || Mount Lemmon || Mount Lemmon Survey || WIT || align=right | 1.0 km || 
|-id=882 bgcolor=#E9E9E9
| 305882 ||  || — || March 20, 2009 || Sandlot || G. Hug || — || align=right | 1.1 km || 
|-id=883 bgcolor=#E9E9E9
| 305883 ||  || — || March 16, 2009 || La Sagra || OAM Obs. || — || align=right | 2.4 km || 
|-id=884 bgcolor=#d6d6d6
| 305884 ||  || — || March 17, 2009 || La Sagra || OAM Obs. || — || align=right | 3.8 km || 
|-id=885 bgcolor=#E9E9E9
| 305885 ||  || — || March 18, 2009 || La Sagra || OAM Obs. || — || align=right | 2.9 km || 
|-id=886 bgcolor=#d6d6d6
| 305886 ||  || — || March 19, 2009 || La Sagra || OAM Obs. || — || align=right | 3.9 km || 
|-id=887 bgcolor=#fefefe
| 305887 ||  || — || March 20, 2009 || Hibiscus || N. Teamo || NYS || align=right | 1.0 km || 
|-id=888 bgcolor=#fefefe
| 305888 ||  || — || March 21, 2009 || Dauban || F. Kugel || MAS || align=right data-sort-value="0.86" | 860 m || 
|-id=889 bgcolor=#E9E9E9
| 305889 ||  || — || March 19, 2009 || Kitt Peak || Spacewatch || HNS || align=right | 1.7 km || 
|-id=890 bgcolor=#E9E9E9
| 305890 ||  || — || March 19, 2009 || Mount Lemmon || Mount Lemmon Survey || HEN || align=right | 1.2 km || 
|-id=891 bgcolor=#E9E9E9
| 305891 ||  || — || March 19, 2009 || Kitt Peak || Spacewatch || — || align=right | 1.8 km || 
|-id=892 bgcolor=#E9E9E9
| 305892 ||  || — || March 20, 2009 || La Sagra || OAM Obs. || — || align=right | 3.2 km || 
|-id=893 bgcolor=#E9E9E9
| 305893 ||  || — || March 21, 2009 || La Sagra || OAM Obs. || HOF || align=right | 3.8 km || 
|-id=894 bgcolor=#E9E9E9
| 305894 ||  || — || March 17, 2009 || Kitt Peak || Spacewatch || — || align=right | 1.0 km || 
|-id=895 bgcolor=#E9E9E9
| 305895 ||  || — || March 22, 2009 || Catalina || CSS || — || align=right | 1.2 km || 
|-id=896 bgcolor=#fefefe
| 305896 ||  || — || March 22, 2009 || Mount Lemmon || Mount Lemmon Survey || — || align=right | 1.0 km || 
|-id=897 bgcolor=#E9E9E9
| 305897 ||  || — || March 24, 2009 || Socorro || LINEAR || — || align=right | 2.7 km || 
|-id=898 bgcolor=#E9E9E9
| 305898 ||  || — || March 24, 2009 || La Sagra || OAM Obs. || GEF || align=right | 1.5 km || 
|-id=899 bgcolor=#d6d6d6
| 305899 ||  || — || March 28, 2009 || Mayhill || A. Lowe || DUR || align=right | 5.2 km || 
|-id=900 bgcolor=#d6d6d6
| 305900 ||  || — || March 24, 2009 || Mount Lemmon || Mount Lemmon Survey || — || align=right | 4.2 km || 
|}

305901–306000 

|-bgcolor=#E9E9E9
| 305901 ||  || — || March 24, 2009 || Mount Lemmon || Mount Lemmon Survey || — || align=right | 2.2 km || 
|-id=902 bgcolor=#E9E9E9
| 305902 ||  || — || March 24, 2009 || Mount Lemmon || Mount Lemmon Survey || AGN || align=right | 1.4 km || 
|-id=903 bgcolor=#fefefe
| 305903 ||  || — || March 16, 2009 || La Sagra || OAM Obs. || MAS || align=right data-sort-value="0.95" | 950 m || 
|-id=904 bgcolor=#E9E9E9
| 305904 ||  || — || March 26, 2009 || Kitt Peak || Spacewatch || — || align=right | 2.6 km || 
|-id=905 bgcolor=#E9E9E9
| 305905 ||  || — || March 26, 2009 || Mount Lemmon || Mount Lemmon Survey || AGN || align=right | 1.4 km || 
|-id=906 bgcolor=#E9E9E9
| 305906 ||  || — || March 28, 2009 || Kitt Peak || Spacewatch || HOF || align=right | 3.4 km || 
|-id=907 bgcolor=#E9E9E9
| 305907 ||  || — || March 25, 2009 || Mount Lemmon || Mount Lemmon Survey || WIT || align=right data-sort-value="0.96" | 960 m || 
|-id=908 bgcolor=#E9E9E9
| 305908 ||  || — || March 21, 2009 || Mount Lemmon || Mount Lemmon Survey || — || align=right | 2.6 km || 
|-id=909 bgcolor=#E9E9E9
| 305909 ||  || — || March 27, 2009 || Kitt Peak || Spacewatch || — || align=right | 2.1 km || 
|-id=910 bgcolor=#d6d6d6
| 305910 ||  || — || March 27, 2009 || Catalina || CSS || — || align=right | 2.3 km || 
|-id=911 bgcolor=#fefefe
| 305911 ||  || — || March 29, 2009 || Kitt Peak || Spacewatch || — || align=right | 1.0 km || 
|-id=912 bgcolor=#E9E9E9
| 305912 ||  || — || March 31, 2009 || Mount Lemmon || Mount Lemmon Survey || HEN || align=right | 1.1 km || 
|-id=913 bgcolor=#d6d6d6
| 305913 ||  || — || March 31, 2009 || Kitt Peak || Spacewatch || TIR || align=right | 4.2 km || 
|-id=914 bgcolor=#d6d6d6
| 305914 ||  || — || March 28, 2009 || Kitt Peak || Spacewatch || — || align=right | 3.9 km || 
|-id=915 bgcolor=#E9E9E9
| 305915 ||  || — || March 19, 2009 || Mount Lemmon || Mount Lemmon Survey || — || align=right | 1.5 km || 
|-id=916 bgcolor=#E9E9E9
| 305916 ||  || — || March 17, 2009 || Kitt Peak || Spacewatch || HOF || align=right | 3.3 km || 
|-id=917 bgcolor=#d6d6d6
| 305917 ||  || — || March 21, 2009 || Mount Lemmon || Mount Lemmon Survey || KOR || align=right | 1.2 km || 
|-id=918 bgcolor=#E9E9E9
| 305918 ||  || — || March 18, 2009 || Mount Lemmon || Mount Lemmon Survey || WIT || align=right | 1.2 km || 
|-id=919 bgcolor=#E9E9E9
| 305919 ||  || — || March 18, 2009 || Kitt Peak || Spacewatch || — || align=right | 1.9 km || 
|-id=920 bgcolor=#d6d6d6
| 305920 ||  || — || March 22, 2009 || Mount Lemmon || Mount Lemmon Survey || — || align=right | 3.4 km || 
|-id=921 bgcolor=#d6d6d6
| 305921 ||  || — || March 24, 2009 || Mount Lemmon || Mount Lemmon Survey || — || align=right | 3.1 km || 
|-id=922 bgcolor=#d6d6d6
| 305922 ||  || — || March 28, 2009 || Kitt Peak || Spacewatch || — || align=right | 3.3 km || 
|-id=923 bgcolor=#E9E9E9
| 305923 ||  || — || March 29, 2009 || Kitt Peak || Spacewatch || — || align=right | 2.0 km || 
|-id=924 bgcolor=#d6d6d6
| 305924 ||  || — || March 31, 2009 || Mount Lemmon || Mount Lemmon Survey || EOS || align=right | 1.9 km || 
|-id=925 bgcolor=#E9E9E9
| 305925 ||  || — || March 18, 2009 || Kitt Peak || Spacewatch || AGN || align=right | 1.4 km || 
|-id=926 bgcolor=#d6d6d6
| 305926 ||  || — || March 31, 2009 || Kitt Peak || Spacewatch || THM || align=right | 2.4 km || 
|-id=927 bgcolor=#d6d6d6
| 305927 ||  || — || March 18, 2009 || Mount Lemmon || Mount Lemmon Survey || HYG || align=right | 2.6 km || 
|-id=928 bgcolor=#d6d6d6
| 305928 ||  || — || March 31, 2009 || Catalina || CSS || — || align=right | 3.2 km || 
|-id=929 bgcolor=#d6d6d6
| 305929 ||  || — || March 31, 2009 || Mount Lemmon || Mount Lemmon Survey || EOS || align=right | 2.2 km || 
|-id=930 bgcolor=#E9E9E9
| 305930 ||  || — || March 18, 2009 || Catalina || CSS || ADE || align=right | 3.1 km || 
|-id=931 bgcolor=#E9E9E9
| 305931 ||  || — || March 21, 2009 || Kitt Peak || Spacewatch || — || align=right | 1.9 km || 
|-id=932 bgcolor=#E9E9E9
| 305932 ||  || — || March 28, 2009 || Kitt Peak || Spacewatch || — || align=right | 2.9 km || 
|-id=933 bgcolor=#d6d6d6
| 305933 ||  || — || March 26, 2009 || Kitt Peak || Spacewatch || — || align=right | 3.9 km || 
|-id=934 bgcolor=#E9E9E9
| 305934 ||  || — || March 16, 2009 || Kitt Peak || Spacewatch || — || align=right | 2.8 km || 
|-id=935 bgcolor=#E9E9E9
| 305935 ||  || — || April 6, 2009 || Hibiscus || N. Teamo || ADE || align=right | 3.0 km || 
|-id=936 bgcolor=#E9E9E9
| 305936 ||  || — || April 13, 2009 || La Sagra || OAM Obs. || — || align=right | 2.0 km || 
|-id=937 bgcolor=#E9E9E9
| 305937 ||  || — || April 15, 2009 || Siding Spring || SSS || — || align=right | 1.4 km || 
|-id=938 bgcolor=#d6d6d6
| 305938 ||  || — || April 1, 2009 || Kitt Peak || Spacewatch || — || align=right | 2.6 km || 
|-id=939 bgcolor=#fefefe
| 305939 ||  || — || April 18, 2009 || Sierra Stars || F. Tozzi || — || align=right | 1.00 km || 
|-id=940 bgcolor=#d6d6d6
| 305940 ||  || — || April 16, 2009 || Catalina || CSS || — || align=right | 5.5 km || 
|-id=941 bgcolor=#fefefe
| 305941 ||  || — || April 17, 2009 || Catalina || CSS || — || align=right | 1.1 km || 
|-id=942 bgcolor=#E9E9E9
| 305942 ||  || — || April 17, 2009 || Catalina || CSS || — || align=right | 1.8 km || 
|-id=943 bgcolor=#E9E9E9
| 305943 ||  || — || April 17, 2009 || Kitt Peak || Spacewatch || HOF || align=right | 2.8 km || 
|-id=944 bgcolor=#d6d6d6
| 305944 ||  || — || April 17, 2009 || Kitt Peak || Spacewatch || — || align=right | 3.4 km || 
|-id=945 bgcolor=#fefefe
| 305945 ||  || — || April 18, 2009 || Kitt Peak || Spacewatch || NYS || align=right data-sort-value="0.71" | 710 m || 
|-id=946 bgcolor=#d6d6d6
| 305946 ||  || — || April 18, 2009 || Kitt Peak || Spacewatch || — || align=right | 2.4 km || 
|-id=947 bgcolor=#d6d6d6
| 305947 ||  || — || April 18, 2009 || Mount Lemmon || Mount Lemmon Survey || — || align=right | 2.9 km || 
|-id=948 bgcolor=#E9E9E9
| 305948 ||  || — || April 18, 2009 || Catalina || CSS || — || align=right | 3.6 km || 
|-id=949 bgcolor=#d6d6d6
| 305949 ||  || — || April 16, 2009 || Catalina || CSS || — || align=right | 4.3 km || 
|-id=950 bgcolor=#d6d6d6
| 305950 ||  || — || April 17, 2009 || Kitt Peak || Spacewatch || — || align=right | 3.4 km || 
|-id=951 bgcolor=#d6d6d6
| 305951 ||  || — || April 18, 2009 || Kitt Peak || Spacewatch || — || align=right | 4.2 km || 
|-id=952 bgcolor=#E9E9E9
| 305952 ||  || — || April 19, 2009 || Kitt Peak || Spacewatch || WIT || align=right | 1.1 km || 
|-id=953 bgcolor=#E9E9E9
| 305953 Josiedubey ||  ||  || April 20, 2009 || Mayhill || N. Falla || — || align=right | 2.2 km || 
|-id=954 bgcolor=#E9E9E9
| 305954 ||  || — || April 18, 2009 || Kitt Peak || Spacewatch || — || align=right | 1.3 km || 
|-id=955 bgcolor=#E9E9E9
| 305955 ||  || — || April 20, 2009 || Kitt Peak || Spacewatch || HEN || align=right | 1.2 km || 
|-id=956 bgcolor=#E9E9E9
| 305956 ||  || — || April 20, 2009 || Kitt Peak || Spacewatch || — || align=right | 2.3 km || 
|-id=957 bgcolor=#E9E9E9
| 305957 ||  || — || April 20, 2009 || Kitt Peak || Spacewatch || — || align=right | 1.3 km || 
|-id=958 bgcolor=#d6d6d6
| 305958 ||  || — || April 21, 2009 || La Sagra || OAM Obs. || — || align=right | 4.8 km || 
|-id=959 bgcolor=#E9E9E9
| 305959 ||  || — || April 21, 2009 || La Sagra || OAM Obs. || — || align=right | 1.5 km || 
|-id=960 bgcolor=#d6d6d6
| 305960 ||  || — || April 21, 2009 || La Sagra || OAM Obs. || URS || align=right | 4.8 km || 
|-id=961 bgcolor=#d6d6d6
| 305961 ||  || — || April 17, 2009 || Kitt Peak || Spacewatch || — || align=right | 4.3 km || 
|-id=962 bgcolor=#E9E9E9
| 305962 ||  || — || April 21, 2009 || Kitt Peak || Spacewatch || — || align=right data-sort-value="0.93" | 930 m || 
|-id=963 bgcolor=#d6d6d6
| 305963 ||  || — || April 20, 2009 || Kitt Peak || Spacewatch || — || align=right | 3.9 km || 
|-id=964 bgcolor=#E9E9E9
| 305964 ||  || — || April 21, 2009 || Mount Lemmon || Mount Lemmon Survey || — || align=right | 1.6 km || 
|-id=965 bgcolor=#d6d6d6
| 305965 ||  || — || April 22, 2009 || La Sagra || OAM Obs. || — || align=right | 3.8 km || 
|-id=966 bgcolor=#E9E9E9
| 305966 ||  || — || April 23, 2009 || Kachina || J. Hobart || — || align=right | 2.8 km || 
|-id=967 bgcolor=#E9E9E9
| 305967 ||  || — || April 19, 2009 || Mount Lemmon || Mount Lemmon Survey || — || align=right | 2.2 km || 
|-id=968 bgcolor=#d6d6d6
| 305968 ||  || — || April 22, 2009 || Mount Lemmon || Mount Lemmon Survey || BRA || align=right | 2.3 km || 
|-id=969 bgcolor=#d6d6d6
| 305969 ||  || — || April 22, 2009 || Mount Lemmon || Mount Lemmon Survey || — || align=right | 3.8 km || 
|-id=970 bgcolor=#d6d6d6
| 305970 ||  || — || April 22, 2009 || Mount Lemmon || Mount Lemmon Survey || — || align=right | 2.7 km || 
|-id=971 bgcolor=#d6d6d6
| 305971 ||  || — || April 28, 2009 || Catalina || CSS || — || align=right | 3.9 km || 
|-id=972 bgcolor=#d6d6d6
| 305972 ||  || — || April 24, 2009 || Mount Lemmon || Mount Lemmon Survey || — || align=right | 2.5 km || 
|-id=973 bgcolor=#d6d6d6
| 305973 ||  || — || March 15, 2009 || Kitt Peak || Spacewatch || Tj (2.94) || align=right | 5.8 km || 
|-id=974 bgcolor=#E9E9E9
| 305974 ||  || — || April 29, 2009 || Kitt Peak || Spacewatch || — || align=right | 1.8 km || 
|-id=975 bgcolor=#d6d6d6
| 305975 ||  || — || April 29, 2009 || Kitt Peak || Spacewatch || — || align=right | 2.5 km || 
|-id=976 bgcolor=#d6d6d6
| 305976 ||  || — || April 24, 2009 || Cerro Burek || Alianza S4 Obs. || — || align=right | 2.6 km || 
|-id=977 bgcolor=#d6d6d6
| 305977 ||  || — || April 22, 2009 || Mount Lemmon || Mount Lemmon Survey || — || align=right | 2.8 km || 
|-id=978 bgcolor=#d6d6d6
| 305978 ||  || — || April 21, 2009 || Mount Lemmon || Mount Lemmon Survey || EOS || align=right | 2.4 km || 
|-id=979 bgcolor=#d6d6d6
| 305979 ||  || — || April 27, 2009 || Purple Mountain || PMO NEO || — || align=right | 3.2 km || 
|-id=980 bgcolor=#d6d6d6
| 305980 ||  || — || April 18, 2009 || Kitt Peak || Spacewatch || — || align=right | 4.9 km || 
|-id=981 bgcolor=#d6d6d6
| 305981 ||  || — || April 17, 2009 || Kitt Peak || Spacewatch || EOS || align=right | 2.5 km || 
|-id=982 bgcolor=#E9E9E9
| 305982 ||  || — || April 18, 2009 || Mount Lemmon || Mount Lemmon Survey || — || align=right | 1.8 km || 
|-id=983 bgcolor=#E9E9E9
| 305983 ||  || — || April 22, 2009 || Kitt Peak || Spacewatch || — || align=right | 2.2 km || 
|-id=984 bgcolor=#E9E9E9
| 305984 ||  || — || April 28, 2009 || Kitt Peak || Spacewatch || — || align=right | 1.8 km || 
|-id=985 bgcolor=#d6d6d6
| 305985 ||  || — || April 19, 2009 || Kitt Peak || Spacewatch || — || align=right | 3.1 km || 
|-id=986 bgcolor=#d6d6d6
| 305986 ||  || — || April 20, 2009 || Mount Lemmon || Mount Lemmon Survey || EOS || align=right | 2.0 km || 
|-id=987 bgcolor=#d6d6d6
| 305987 ||  || — || May 13, 2009 || Kitt Peak || Spacewatch || — || align=right | 4.4 km || 
|-id=988 bgcolor=#E9E9E9
| 305988 ||  || — || May 12, 2009 || Catalina || CSS || — || align=right | 2.7 km || 
|-id=989 bgcolor=#d6d6d6
| 305989 ||  || — || May 13, 2009 || Kitt Peak || Spacewatch || — || align=right | 5.2 km || 
|-id=990 bgcolor=#fefefe
| 305990 ||  || — || May 13, 2009 || Kitt Peak || Spacewatch || — || align=right | 1.1 km || 
|-id=991 bgcolor=#E9E9E9
| 305991 ||  || — || May 13, 2009 || Kitt Peak || Spacewatch || GEF || align=right | 1.4 km || 
|-id=992 bgcolor=#E9E9E9
| 305992 ||  || — || May 15, 2009 || La Sagra || OAM Obs. || — || align=right | 1.5 km || 
|-id=993 bgcolor=#E9E9E9
| 305993 ||  || — || May 24, 2009 || La Sagra || OAM Obs. || — || align=right | 2.2 km || 
|-id=994 bgcolor=#E9E9E9
| 305994 ||  || — || May 18, 2009 || La Sagra || OAM Obs. || — || align=right | 3.2 km || 
|-id=995 bgcolor=#d6d6d6
| 305995 ||  || — || May 25, 2009 || Kitt Peak || Spacewatch || — || align=right | 4.1 km || 
|-id=996 bgcolor=#d6d6d6
| 305996 ||  || — || May 26, 2009 || Kitt Peak || Spacewatch || EOS || align=right | 2.8 km || 
|-id=997 bgcolor=#d6d6d6
| 305997 ||  || — || May 26, 2009 || Kitt Peak || Spacewatch || — || align=right | 2.9 km || 
|-id=998 bgcolor=#d6d6d6
| 305998 ||  || — || May 26, 2009 || Kitt Peak || Spacewatch || — || align=right | 3.5 km || 
|-id=999 bgcolor=#fefefe
| 305999 ||  || — || June 6, 2005 || Siding Spring || SSS || — || align=right | 1.2 km || 
|-id=000 bgcolor=#C2FFFF
| 306000 ||  || — || May 27, 2004 || Kitt Peak || Spacewatch || L4 || align=right | 14 km || 
|}

References

External links 
 Discovery Circumstances: Numbered Minor Planets (305001)–(310000) (IAU Minor Planet Center)

0305